= Waitrose Duchy Organic =

Supermarket food brand

- Product type: Organic produce
- Current owner: Waitrose
- Country: United Kingdom
- Introduced: 2015
- Markets: Grocery
- Previous owners: Duchy Originals
- Tagline: Good Food, Good Farming, Good Causes
- Website: Waitrose Duchy Organic

Waitrose Duchy Organic (formerly Duchy Originals from Waitrose and earlier simply Duchy Originals) is a brand of organic food sold in Waitrose stores in the United Kingdom. The brand is a partnership between Waitrose and Duchy Originals Limited, a company set up in 1990 by King Charles III when he was Prince of Wales and Duke of Cornwall. The Duchy Originals company is named after the Duchy of Cornwall estates that are held in trust by the Duke of Cornwall, who often holds the title Prince of Wales.

== History ==
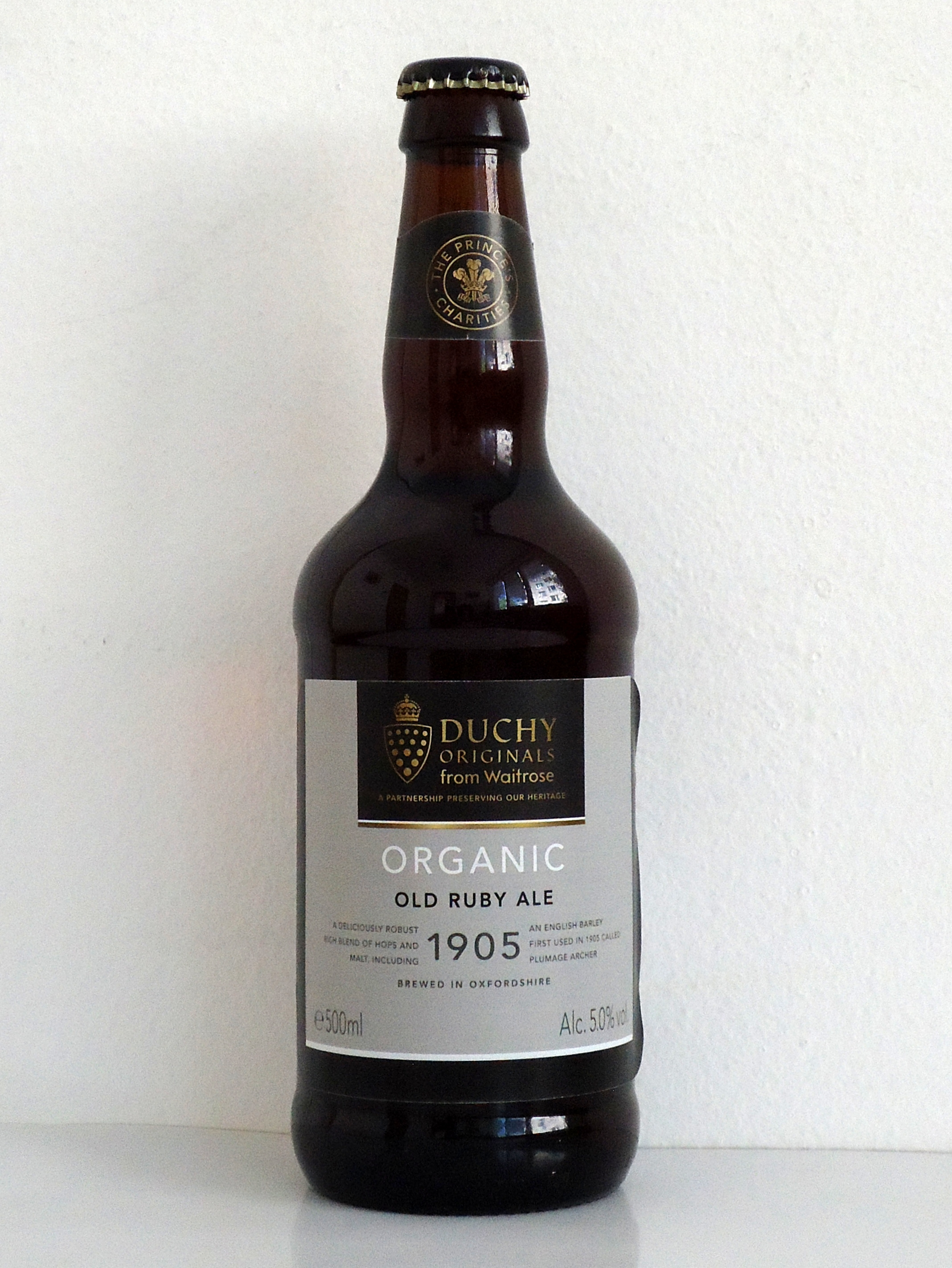
A bottle of ale under the Duchy Originals from Waitrose brand, 2012

The Duchy Originals brand was originally conceived in 1990 as an outlet for the organic food grown on the Prince of Wales' Highgrove House estate and nearby Home Farm which he had leased from the Duchy of Cornwall in the mid-1980s. The first Duchy Originals product was oaten biscuits. Products were initially sold through high-end stores such as Harrods and Fortnum & Mason. During the 1990s, Duchy Originals products began being stocked in farm shops and independent delicatessens and expansion during the 2000s saw a selected range of Duchy Originals products becoming widely available in most major UK supermarkets, with Waitrose as the brand's largest customer. By 2008 sales of Duchy Originals had raised over £7 million cumulatively for The Prince of Wales's Charitable Fund.

Due to the 2008 financial crisis, the Duchy Originals business began losing money, amounting to around £3 million in 2009, and in September of that year Duchy Originals agreed an exclusive deal with Waitrose. From August 2010 products were relaunched under the Duchy Originals from Waitrose brand and the then range of around 200 lines was expanded to over 300. Waitrose invested heavily in the brand and sales doubled during the first three years of the exclusive arrangement. By 2013 the brand was selling in 30 countries including Australia and Japan. In the summer of 2015 the brand name was changed to Waitrose Duchy Organic. The tradition of donating royalties to charity continued and Prince Charles continued his involvement with the brand which operates separately from the Duchy of Cornwall. The lease on Home Farm was not renewed in 2020, but the Prince of Wales continued to farm organically at Sandringham House. The new tenant of Home Farm continued the relationship with Waitrose Duchy Organic, which reported a profit of £3.6 million in 2021.

== The brands ==
The company Duchy Originals, a wholly owned subsidiary of King Charles III Charitable Fund, originated the Duchy Originals brand in 1990 as a premium organic food and drink brand. It also created two other brands, Duchy Selections and Duchy Collections. Duchy Selections was a range of premium free range (but not organic) pork and fish products and mineral waters, and Duchy Collections was a range of high quality non food products. The Duchy Originals company has never sold the goods that carry the brand names, and other than the short-lived Duchy Originals Food company venture it has not manufactured them. Instead Duchy branded products have been sold and manufactured by a number of different retail companies, all of whom have paid royalties to the Duchy Originals Company.

== Financial information ==
By the end of the 1990s the brand had an annual turnover of around £1 million. This had grown to £4.86 million by 2006/7. Administrative expenses came to £3.31 million, giving an operating profit of £1.53 million. The company was badly hit by the recession in 2007 and started making a loss. For the financial year 2008/9, the company failed to make any profits and turnover dropped to £2.2 million, with an operating loss of £3.3 million, compared to the previous year's operating profit of £57,000. Fortunes improved after the 2009 Waitrose arrangement, and by 2013 annual profits were £2.8 million.

== The Duchy Originals Food company ==
Duchy Originals' only venture into manufacturing has been the Duchy Originals Food company. This was a wholly owned subsidiary of the Duchy Originals company and it opened a factory in Launceston, Cornwall in 2006. The factory was a bakery making both sweet and savoury pastry products. The venture suffered financial problems, with the factory making a loss of £447,158 in the financial year 2006/7. In 2009, the Duchy Originals company decided to sell the bakery, with one-off costs from the sale contributing towards Duchy Originals making a loss for 2009–10.

== Herbal medicines ==
In 2008, Duchy Originals partnered with the alternative medicine company Nelsons to produce a line of herbal remedies. This led to controversy, in which leading UK scientists said that Duchy Originals promoted its herbal remedies with scientifically unsound claims. Edzard Ernst, the UK's first professor of complementary medicine, said Duchy Originals detoxification products were "outright quackery". Subsequently, the Medicines and Healthcare products Regulatory Agency (MHRA) ruled that healing claims were misleading and required the company to amend an advertising campaign promoting two herbal medicines.

== Mineral water ==
In 2002 the Deeside Water Company began to produce some of its bottled mineral water for the Duchy Originals brand. In 2010, Waitrose rebranded the product as Duchy Originals from Waitrose and in 2016 the supermarket repackaged it as part of its Waitrose One premium range.

== Garden tools ==
Gardening tools were produced under the Duchy Originals brand by the Lancashire company Caldwells until it went into administration in 2009.

== Charitable giving ==
The company Duchy Originals Ltd is a wholly owned subsidiary company of King Charles III Charitable Fund and donates to the charity from its profits. By 2013 the brand had raised £11 million from its profits for the Kings's Charities. In Canada the proceeds from sales of Duchy Originals products are donated to the charities associated with The Prince's Charities Canada. By 2012 more than one million Canadian dollars were being raised annually in this manner.

== The Duchy Future Farming programme ==
The Duchy Future Farming programme was set up in 2013 in partnership with the Soil Association to provide advice and support to UK farmers and growers in conducting research into organic farming methods. Participants are encouraged to carry out experiments in their own fields, and over 3000 farmers had been involved in this by 2015. A research fund offering up to £25,000 is also available.
