= The King's Foundation =

British design and architecture education charity

- Formation: 1990; 36 years ago
- Founder: Charles III
- Type: Charity
- Purpose: to improve the wellbeing of people and the planet, build thriving, sustainable communities and transform lives
- Location: Dumfries House, Cumnock, Scotland, KA18 2NJ
- Region served: United Kingdom and the Commonwealth; Myanmar; China; Azerbaijan; Egypt; Qatar; Saudi Arabia
- Website: kings-foundation.org
- Formerly called: The Prince of Wales's Institute of Architecture (1990–2001); The Prince's Foundation for the Built Environment (2001–2012); The Prince's Foundation for Building Community (2012–2018); The Prince's Foundation (2018–2023)

The King's Foundation (formerly the Prince of Wales's Institute of Architecture until 2001, the Prince's Foundation for the Built Environment until 2012, the Prince's Foundation for Building Community until 2018, and the Prince's Foundation until 2023) is an educational charity established in 1990 by King Charles III (then Prince of Wales) to build sustainable communities and transform lives with an emphasis on protecting and promoting nature.

The King's Foundation has trained over 115,000 students, and since 2013, over 90,000 students have participated in education, health, and wellbeing programmes. The foundation has also involved over 8,000 people in designing a hundred projects which include university campuses, new towns and numerous buildings including the redeveloped Alder Hey Children's Hospital which opened in 2015. Additionally, the projects have created thousands of jobs in the United Kingdom.

Working in more than 35 countries, including Australia, Bahrain, Bangladesh, Sierra Leone, and Sri Lanka, the foundation collaborates with local organisations to improve town planning, urban renewal, and sustainable development.

== Structure ==
The King's Foundation (then The Prince's Foundation) was founded as a part of the Prince's Charities, a group of not-for-profit organizations of which Charles III is President: 17 of the 19 charities were founded personally by the King. In 2007 the charity received a donation of £332,408 from the Prince's Charities Foundation.

The Prince's Regeneration Trust (PRT) was merged with the Prince's Foundation on 8 December 2016. Most of the real estate assets of The PRT were vested in the United Kingdom Building Preservation Trust, a registered charity, and the work on fifty four heritage projects listed in the 2017 PRT annual report was discontinued.

=== Ambassadors ===
According to the King's Foundation's official website, the foundation's ambassadors include the following:

- Alan Titchmarsh
- David Beckham
- George Clarke
- Jools Holland
- Kate Winslet
- Maro Itoje
- Patrick Grant
- Penny Lancaster
- Raymond Blanc
- Rod Stewart
- Sarah Beeny
- Sienna Miller

== Perspectives ==
Perspectives on Architecture magazine was funded by the Institute of Architecture and published from April 1994 until March 1998. It reflected the aims of the Institute but was editorially independent, with the editor for the first five issues being Dan Cruickshank, followed by Giles Worsley. The first Premier issue was launched on 15 March 1994 with a cover date of April 1994 and a print run of 75,000 although later that year sales were well below the breakeven target of 35,000 a month.

The magazine was published jointly by Peter Murray's Wordsearch Ltd and Perfect Harmony Ltd, the later being a company bought and established in 1993 as the publishing arm of the Institute of Architecture. The magazine was issued monthly (excluding December) until March 1996, when it became bi-monthly, starting with the April/May issue. It ceased publication in 1998 after four years and 33 issues, with its February/March issue being the last.

In his first editorial, Cruickshank wrote that "Perspectives is concerned with the care and conservation of the best aspects of our built history and the countryside, and with the protection of the landscape, but it is also committed to the evolution of a new architecture which combines temporary technology with the inspirational ideas offered by traditional buildings... The reconciliation of the old and the new, united with a concern for relating new buildings to their settings, will restore delight to our view of the world. Perspectives will campaign for beauty and inspiration and a recovery of that spiritual sense of the numinous that only great architecture or great works of art can offer."

== Future role ==
After the Government announced in 2010 that it would withdraw funding for CABE (successor body to the Royal Fine Arts Commission, est. 1924), the Prince of Wales offered that PFBE could take over its role as arbiter of design in major planning applications. Modernist architects expressed dismay at the suggestion.

In 2010, the Foundation decided to help reconstruct and redesign buildings in Port-au-Prince, Haiti after the capital was destroyed by the 2010 Haiti earthquake. The foundation is known for refurbishing historic buildings in Kabul, Afghanistan and Kingston, Jamaica. The project has been called the "biggest challenge yet" for the Prince's Foundation for the Built Environment.

In January 2023, it was reported that Highgrove House, Dumfries House, and the Castle of Mey would be open to the public as a part of an initiative by the Prince's Foundation to tackle loneliness and isolation in cold weather by providing warm spaces.

In June 2024 the inaugural King's Foundation Awards were handed out during a ceremony at St James's Palace. The awards consisted of nine categories, including the King Charles III Harmony Award which was presented to Ban Ki-moon. In October, the King's Foundation Australia was officially launched, and its first major project is the restoration of the Hillview Estate, the former Vice-Regal summer residence for NSW Governors.

In May 2026, the King's Foundation and FormationQ announced a new partnership to showcase how towns and cities across the Commonwealth can grow sustainably using quantum technology.

== Cash for honours allegations and other donations ==
=== Mahfouz Marei Mubarak bin Mahfouz ===
In August 2021, it was announced that the foundation was launching an investigation into the reports that middlemen took cuts for setting up dinners involving wealthy donors and King Charles, with prices as high as £100,000 and the fixers taking up to 25% of the fees. An overnight stay at the Scottish mansion Dumfries House was also being offered. In the following month it was alleged that the prince's aide Michael Fawcett had fixed a CBE for Saudi businessman Mahfouz Marei Mubarak bin Mahfouz who donated more than £1.5 million to royal charities contrary to section 1 of the Honours (Prevention of Abuses) Act 1925. Charles gave Mahfouz his Honorary CBE at a private ceremony at Buckingham Palace in November 2016, though the event was not published in the Court Circular. The allegations led to Fawcett temporarily stepping down from his role as chief executive of the Prince's Foundation, while Republic reported the prince and Fawcett to the police.

In November 2021, Fawcett resigned from his role as chief executive of the Prince's Foundation, and the Charity Commission launched an investigation into allegations that the donations meant for the Prince's Foundation had been instead sent to the Mahfouz Foundation. The auditing firm EY, which was hired by the charity to carry out an investigation, published a summary report in December 2021, stating that Fawcett had co-ordinated with "fixers", but there was "no evidence that trustees at the time were aware of these communications".

In February 2022 the Metropolitan Police launched an investigation into the cash-for-honours allegations linked to the Prince's Foundation. On 6 September 2022, officers interviewed under caution, a man in his fifties and a man in his forties. On 31 October 2022, the Metropolitan Police passed their evidence to the Crown Prosecution Service for deliberation. In August 2023, the Metropolitan Police announced that after speaking with a number of witnesses and reviewing over 200 documents they had concluded their investigations and no further actions would be taken.

=== Lord Brownlow of Shurlock Row ===
Lord Brownlow of Shurlock Row was a trustee of the Prince's Foundation between 2013 and 2018, serving for a period as Chairman. Between 2012 and 2017, Havisham Properties, owned by Brownlow, purchased 11 properties for £1.7 million on the Knockroon development, a site originally acquired as a piece of farmland by King Charles when he bought nearby Dumfries House, and intended to become an eco-village. Dumfries House Trust also awarded Brownlow's company a £1.2 million construction contract. In July 2022, a spokesman for the Office of the Scottish Charity Regulator said "we can confirm that the work of Havisham Group and property transactions relating to the Knockroon development in Ayrshire forms part of our overall investigation, work on which is ongoing." Brownlow was appointed a Commander of the Royal Victorian Order (CVO) in the 2018 Birthday Honours. The Prince's Foundation said "Lord Brownlow was appointed CVO in recognition of his role of chair of the Prince's Foundation for Building Community."

=== Other donations ===
In 2021, the foundation's chairman Douglas Connell quit his job over claims the charity had accepted a £200,000 donation from Russian convict, Dmitry Leus, with the prince thanking the businessman in a letter and suggesting a meeting. This led to an investigation by the Scottish Charity Regulator. Clarence House responded that Charles had "no knowledge of the alleged offer of honours or British citizenship on the basis of donation to his charities and fully supports the investigation".

In October 2021, additional questions were raised over contributions by Bruno Wang, who donated £500,000 to the foundation.

In August 2022, there were reports that Viatcheslav Kantor, who has been described as a Russian oligarch close to Vladimir Putin, had pledged £3 million to the Prince's Foundation prior to the Russian invasion of Ukraine and would have paid the money over the course of 10 years, starting in 2019. Kantor was sanctioned by the UK following the invasion and was among 210 politicians and oligarchs placed by the United States Department of the Treasury on their 'Putin list' following alleged Russian interference in the 2016 United States presidential election. As with other donations, Clarence House said "the decision to accept this money would have rested with the charity's trustees."

The Scottish Charity Regulator announced the findings of their three-year investigation in January 2025. They found no evidence of wrongdoing by Fawcett or the foundation's trustees, but they did find it "unacceptable" that he had failed to inform colleagues about problems that had emerged about funding and donations. The investigation found that the organisation was "exposed to substantial risk" as a result of some of Fawcett's conduct.

== See also ==
- The Royal Countryside Fund
