= Nelsons (Homeopathy) =

British alternative medicine company

A Nelson & Co Limited (formerly called A. Nelson & Company Limited from 1930–1983), trading as Nelsons, is a British alternative medicine company, with subsidiaries in Germany and the US. The head office and manufacturing facilities are located in Wimbledon, London, with a retail pharmacy in Central London. Spatone is manufactured at the Trefriw Wells Spa in Snowdonia, Wales.

== History ==
In 1860 Ernst Louis Armbrecht, a student of Samuel Hahnemann who founded homeopathy, moved to London where he opened a homeopathic pharmacy in Ryder Street so as to put into practice the principles learned from his teacher. Armbrecht married Charlotte Nelson in 1866 and soon after began trading as Armbrecht, Nelson & Co., later to be abbreviated to A. Nelson & Co.

In 1890, Nelsons Homeopathic Pharmacy moved to Duke Street and is still trading there today. For most of Nelsons' history all manufacturing was done in the basement of the Duke St site, but in the 1970s it was moved to Brixton and later Wimbledon. In the 1990s a second pharmacy was opened in Dublin which closed at the end of June 2012.

The company was owned by the same family for more than 100 years, but the remaining descendants of the founding family were killed in the Staines air crash in 1972. The remaining management team approached Dick Wilson, who had a long-standing passion and commitment to complementary medicine, to take over the company.

Under Wilson's management Nelsons began production of their first range of over the counter homeopathic medicines in 1981.

=== The Dr Edward Bach Centre ===
In the 1930s Edward Bach, a doctor with a keen interest in homeopathy, supplied the Nelsons Homeopathic Pharmacy with mother tinctures so they could make up stock bottles of his increasingly popular Bach flower remedies for sale. The Bach Centre, founded by Dr Bach to continue his work, continued its relationship with Nelsons on and off for many years. In the 1980s, when increasing worldwide sales and new regulatory requirements made it impractical for the Bach Centre to continue producing the remedies in-house, the Centre invited Nelsons to take over full distribution. This was initially through a dedicated bottling plant in Abingdon and later moved to Wimbledon.

Nelsons continue to use plants from the gardens at Dr Bach's former home, Mount Vernon in Oxfordshire, to make remedies. Nelsons acquired the Bach Centre's remedy-making business for 4.3 million pounds in 1993.

It is sometimes said that the Bach Centre itself was sold to Nelsons. Evidence for this appeared in a court judgement that listed the sale as including the company Bach Centre Mount Vernon Ltd, whose "principal present activities are making the tinctures for the Remedies, selling the Remedies in or from Mount Vernon, writing and distributing written and cassette material about the Remedies, organising and running educational programmes, providing free public advice and information on the Remedies, and maintaining Mount Vernon including artefacts which belonged to Dr Bach and historical records." This is, however, an error. The Centre itself is owned by the Dr Edward Bach Healing Trust, a registered UK charity. Two companies operate out of the Centre, Bach Centre Mount Vernon Ltd, and Bach Visitor and Education Centre Ltd. Both are privately owned, and Nelsons has no stake in either.

=== Recent history ===
Nelsons is Europe's oldest and the UK's largest manufacturer of homeopathic preparations. Nelsons has expanded their range beyond the original homeopathic family of products and into other areas of complementary and natural medicine. The most obvious example of this is the Bach flower remedies and in particular Rescue Remedy, which is sold all over the world. More recently the company has acquired other natural health businesses such as the 2003 acquisition of the Trefriw Wells Spa in Wales, which produces a mineral water naturally high in iron called Spatone that is used as a dietary supplement, and Nice 'n Clear, a natural head louse lotion. Nelsons also produces some traditional herbal remedies such as Arnica creams.

With the exception of the Spatone well, all Nelsons products are manufactured in Wimbledon in southwest London and from there exported to countries around the world. The company has opened subsidiary offices in Boston in the US and Hamburg in Germany. The company is run today by Dick's eldest son, Robert, and his brother Patrick.

In December 2008 during a visit to the factory in Wimbledon, Charles, Prince of Wales announced a partnership between Nelsons and his Duchy Originals brand to produce a line of herbal remedies. He watched the first batch of products being produced and afterwards gave a speech to staff where he said he had great admiration for the company and had been brought up with their products.

In 2009 Nelsons was named "Best UK Family Business, £25m+ turnover category" in the Coutts Prize for Family Business 2008/2009.

2010 was the 150th anniversary of the founding of Nelsons, which was celebrated with a float at the Lord Mayor's Show in London.

The Dublin dispensary closed at the end of June 2012 citing economic factors and company developments.

=== Controversy ===
In 2006, Nelsons was one of several companies to be exposed by BBC Newsnight as encouraging patients to take a homeopathic anti-malarial tablet, without also advising them to visit their general practitioner for an anti-malarial medicine. Scientists said that companies doing this could be putting lives at risk. "There is no scientific proof that homeopathic remedies are effective in either preventing or treating malaria." Nelsons said they reiterated to their staff that this should be done.

The U.S. Food and Drug Administration (FDA) conducted an inspection of a Nelsons manufacturing facility from 14 November to 17 November 2011 and cited concerns in the areas of Current Good Manufacturing Practices and misbranding. The investigator observed glass fragments present during the manufacturing process without adequate procedures documented or in use to ensure the product was not contaminated. It was also noted that one out of every six bottles was found not to have any active ingredient. For the bottles that contained the active ingredient, it was not homogeneously applied. Pills at the top of the bottle had more of the ingredient applied than those at the bottom and there were no controls in place to ensure uniform distribution of the active ingredient. Laboratory testing documentation did not meet established specifications and standards because important details were missing from records. Nelsons did not have their instrumentation calibrated at the proper intervals or written procedures in place for that calibration. Certain drugs were found to be misbranded because on Nelsons' website they were said to be for the treatment of disease, but did not display "Rx Only" designation. There was a further FDA inspection at Nelsons manufacturing facility in January 2016 and it was confirmed that all previous findings had been addressed and rectified.

== Products ==
Rescue Remedy Rescue Remedy is a combination of five Bach flower essences and is sold around the world in a variety of formats, including liquid, cream, pastilles and a night formulation.

Bach Original Flower Remedies The Bach Original Flower Remedies is the set of 38 flower essences as created by Dr Bach.

Nelsons Arnicare The Arnicare (Arnileve in the US) range of products are topical creams based on the Arnica herb, which is traditionally used in the treatment of bruises.

Nelsons Pure and Clear Pure and Clear is a set of related skincare remedies.

Nelsons H+Care H+Care is a range of herbal remedies claimed for Haemorrhoids

Nelsons Homeopathy A range of homeopathic preparations in a variety of forms including tablets and topical creams.

Nelsons Teetha A homeopathic preparation claimed without evidence to soothe and calm the symptoms of teething.

Spatone Spatone is a mineral water containing iron.

Nice 'n Clear Nice 'n' Clear is a head lice solution.

=== Licensed ranges ===
Nelsons produces a number of 'own label' products on behalf of other companies, including:

- Boots the Chemist own label homeopathy products and teething granules.
- Tesco own label homeopathy.
- Duchy Originals herbal remedies
