= Lord Brownlow =

Lord Brownlow may refer to:

- Baron Brownlow, a title in the Peerage of Great Britain
  - Peregrine Cust, 6th Baron Brownlow (1899–1978), British peer and courtier
- David Brownlow, Baron Brownlow of Shurlock Row (born 1963), British entrepreneur and philanthropist
