= Duchy of Cornwall =

Royal duchy in England

- Arms of the Duke of Cornwall
- Type: Crown body (tax-exempt)
- Founded: 17 March 1337 (689 years ago)
- Owner: Prince William, Duke of Cornwall
- Website: duchyofcornwall.org

The Duchy of Cornwall (Cornish: Duketh Kernow) is one of two royal duchies in England, the other being the Duchy of Lancaster. The eldest son of the reigning British monarch obtains possession of the duchy and the title of Duke of Cornwall at birth or when his parent succeeds to the throne, but may not sell assets for personal benefit and has limited rights and income while a minor.

The current duke is William, Prince of Wales. When the monarch has no (legitimate) male children, the rights and responsibilities of the duchy revert to the Crown. (Note: The Succession to the Crown Act 2013 does not affect succession to the duchy; if the heir apparent is female, she cannot inherit it.)

The Duchy Council, known as the Prince's Council, meets semiannually and is chaired by the Duke. It is a non-executive body providing advice on management of the duchy. The duchy also exercises certain legal rights and privileges in Cornwall and the Isles of Scilly, including some that elsewhere in England belong to the Crown. The duke appoints several local officials and acts as port authority for the main harbour of the Isles of Scilly.

The government considers the duchy a Crown body and therefore exempt from corporation tax. This tax-exempt status has been challenged. From 1993 onward, the then-Prince of Wales (later King Charles III) voluntarily paid income tax on the duchy's surplus after official expenditure. William has continued the practice, and in 2026 it was reported that he paid £8.34 million in tax for the 2023–24 financial year and £7.76 million for 2024–25.

== Financial arrangements ==
The principal activity of the duchy is the management of its land holdings in England of 135,000 acres or 55,000 ha. This includes 7,571 ha or 18,710 acres of land in Cornwall itself which comprises 13% of the whole Duchy estate. Half of the estate is on Dartmoor in Devon, with other large holdings in Herefordshire, Somerset and almost all of the Isles of Scilly. The duchy also has a portfolio of financial investments.

The administration of the duchy is regulated by the Duchies of Lancaster and Cornwall (Accounts) Act 1838, which requires the Treasury's supervision and for the accounts to be presented to both Houses of Parliament.

The duchy has special legal rights, such as the rules on bona vacantia. This right to ownerless property operates in favour of the duchy rather than the Crown, such that the property of anyone who dies in the county of Cornwall without a will or identifiable heirs, and assets belonging to dissolved companies whose registered office was in Cornwall, pass to the duchy. In 2007, £130,000 was realised from the right of bona vacantia, and given to a charitable fund.

The duchy was created with the express purpose of providing income to the heir apparent to the throne; however, the terms of the original creation limit the title Duke of Cornwall to the eldest son of the monarch if, and only if, that son is also the heir-apparent; since the Succession to the Crown Act 2013 which came into force in 2015, the eldest child (regardless of sex) of the monarch would usually be the heir-apparent, but no change has been made to allow an eldest daughter to take the title Duchess of Cornwall. The Duke of Cornwall has the 'interest in possession' of the duchy's assets (such as estates) which means they enjoy its net income, do not have its outright ownership and do not have the right to sell capital assets for their own benefit.

In 1913, the government law officers gave an opinion that the Duke of Cornwall is not liable to taxation on income from the Duchy. However, from 1993 to his accession to the throne in 2022, Prince Charles voluntarily agreed to pay income tax at the normal rates (see Finances of the British royal family).

Since the coming into force of the Sovereign Grant Act 2011, revenues of the Duchy of Cornwall will pass to the heir to the throne, regardless of whether that heir is the Duke of Cornwall. In the event that the heir is a minor, 10% of the revenues will pass to the heir, with the balance passing to the Crown.

The duchy generated an income of £21.7m in 2017–18. This paid for most of the official and charitable activities of the Prince of Wales and the Duchess of Cornwall, as well as the official offices of the Duke and Duchess of Cambridge and Prince Harry.

The duchy paid William £23.6 million in his first full year as Duke of Cornwall; the income supports the charitable and private activities of William, his wife, and their three children. In 2025, the Duke of Cornwall waived more than £10,000 a year in rents for charities, councils and community groups using Duchy land, including lifeboat stations, playing fields and village halls.

== History ==
Duchy of Cornwall Act 1623
- Act of Parliament
- Parliament of England
- Long title: An Act to enable the most excellent prince Charles to make leases of lands, parcel of his Highness duchy of Cornwall, or annexed to the same.
- Citation: 21 Jas. 1. c. 29
- Territorial extent: England and Wales

Dates
- Royal assent: 29 May 1624
- Commencement: 12 February 1624 (Note: Start of session.)
- Repealed: 30 July 1948
Other legislation
Repealed by	Statute Law Revision Act 1948
Relates to	Duchy of Cornwall Act 1625; Duchy of Cornwall Act 1661; Duchy of Cornwall Act 1670; Duchy of Cornwall (No. 2) Act 1670; Duchy of Cornwall Act 1672; Duchy of Cornwall Act 1685; Duchy of Cornwall Act 1694; Duchy of Cornwall Act 1713; Duchy of Cornwall Act 1715

Status: Repealed

Text of statute as originally enacted

Duchy of Cornwall Act 1625
- Act of Parliament
- Parliament of England
- Long title: An Act to enable the King's majesty to make leases of lands, parcel of his Highness dutchy of Cornwall, or annexed to the same.
- Citation: 1 Cha. 1. c. 2
- Territorial extent: England and Wales

Dates
- Royal assent: 12 August 1625
- Commencement: 17 May 1625
- Repealed: 30 July 1948
Other legislation
Repealed by	Statute Law Revision Act 1948
Relates to	Duchy of Cornwall Act 1623; Duchy of Cornwall Act 1661; Duchy of Cornwall Act 1670; Duchy of Cornwall (No. 2) Act 1670; Duchy of Cornwall Act 1672; Duchy of Cornwall Act 1685; Duchy of Cornwall Act 1694; Duchy of Cornwall Act 1713; Duchy of Cornwall Act 1715

Status: Repealed

Text of statute as originally enacted

The duchy was established on 17 March 1337 by the Royal Great Charter out of the former Earldom of Cornwall by Edward III for his son, Edward, Prince of Wales, the "Black Prince", who became the first Duke of Cornwall.

The charter established that the Duke of Cornwall is to be the eldest surviving son of the monarch and the heir to the throne. Additional charters were issued later by Edward III. The duchy consisted of the title and honour, and the land holdings that supported it financially. The charter afforded the duke certain rights and responsibilities in the county, including the right to appoint the county's sheriff and to the profits from the county courts, the stannaries and the ports. The duchy estate, which was based on the holdings of the previous earls, did not comprise the whole of the county, and much of it lay outside Cornwall. The extent of the estate has varied as various holdings have been sold and others acquired over the years, both within Cornwall and in other counties.

Under the charter, the manors of the earldom passed to the duchy. The original 17 manors, all in Cornwall, are known as the antiqua maneria. Those outside Cornwall given to the duchy at its creation are known as the forinseca maneria (foreign manors), with estates incorporated later becoming known as the annexata maneria.

The first duke ordered a survey called "The Caption of Seisin of the Duchy of Cornwall" in May 1337 to determine the extent of duchy holdings of Cornish land including manors, castles and knights' fees, profits from the stannary courts and shrievalty of Cornwall, and other revenues.

A subsequent charter of Henry IV to Prince Henry stated:

We have made and created Henry our most dear first-begotten Son, Prince of Wales, Duke of Cornwall and Earl of Chester, and have given and granted, and by our Charter have confirmed to him the said Principality, Duchy, and Earldom, that he may preside there, and by presiding, may direct and defend the said parts. We have invested him with the said Principality, Duchy, and Earldom, per sertum in capite et annulum in digito aureum ac virgam auream juxta morem.

With the death of Prince Arthur in 1502, the Prince's Council became defunct. From 1547 to 1603, there was no male royal heir to hold the title of duke, and the duchy reverted to the Crown, in effect becoming a department of the Exchequer. The council was revived in 1611 to deal with a food crisis.

=== In the Interregnum, 1649–1660 ===
On the execution of Charles I, the Crown lands came under the control of Parliament; this lasted until the restoration of Charles II in 1660.

=== Post-Interregnum ===
Duchy of Cornwall Act 1661
- Act of Parliament
- Parliament of England
- Long title: An Act to enable the Kings Majestie to make Leases Grants and Copies of Offices Lands Tenements and Hereditaments parcell of his Highnes Dutchy of Cornwall or annexed to the same and for Confirmacion of Leases and Grants already made.
- Citation: 13 Cha. 2. St. 2. c. 4
- Territorial extent: England and Wales

Dates
- Royal assent: 20 December 1661
- Commencement: 20 November 1661
- Repealed: 30 July 1948
Other legislation
Repealed by	Statute Law Revision Act 1948
Relates to	Duchy of Cornwall Act 1623; Duchy of Cornwall Act 1625; Duchy of Cornwall Act 1670; Duchy of Cornwall (No. 2) Act 1670; Duchy of Cornwall Act 1672; Duchy of Cornwall Act 1685; Duchy of Cornwall Act 1694; Duchy of Cornwall Act 1713; Duchy of Cornwall Act 1715

Status: Repealed

Text of statute as originally enacted

Duchy of Cornwall Act 1670
- Act of Parliament
- Parliament of England
- Long title: An Act for advanceing the Sale of Fee-Farme Rents and other Rents.
- Citation: 22 Cha. 2. c. 6
- Territorial extent: England and Wales

Dates
- Royal assent: 11 April 1670
- Commencement: 14 February 1670
- Repealed: 30 July 1948
Other legislation
Repealed by	Duchy of Lancaster Act 1779; Crown Land Revenues, etc. Act 1786; Statute Law Revision Act 1948
Relates to	Duchy of Cornwall Act 1623; Duchy of Cornwall Act 1625; Duchy of Cornwall Act 1661; Duchy of Cornwall (No. 2) Act 1670; Duchy of Cornwall Act 1672; Duchy of Cornwall Act 1685; Duchy of Cornwall Act 1694; Duchy of Cornwall Act 1713; Duchy of Cornwall Act 1715

Status: Repealed

Text of statute as originally enacted

Duchy of Cornwall (No. 2) Act 1670
- Act of Parliament
- Parliament of England
- Long title: An Act to enable the Kings Majestie to make Leases, Grants and Copyes of Offices, Lands Tenements and Hereditaments Parcell of his Highnesse Dutchy of Cornwall, or annexed to the same.
- Citation: 22 Cha. 2. c. 7
- Territorial extent: England and Wales

Dates
- Royal assent: 11 April 1670
- Commencement: 14 February 1670
- Repealed: 30 July 1948
Other legislation
Repealed by	Statute Law Revision Act 1948
Relates to	Duchy of Cornwall Act 1623; Duchy of Cornwall Act 1625; Duchy of Cornwall (No. 2) Act 1670; Duchy of Cornwall (No. 2) Act 1670; Duchy of Cornwall Act 1672; Duchy of Cornwall Act 1685; Duchy of Cornwall Act 1694; Duchy of Cornwall Act 1713; Duchy of Cornwall Act 1715

Status: Repealed

Text of statute as originally enacted

Duchy of Cornwall Act 1672
- Act of Parliament
- Parliament of England
- Long title: An Act for enableing his Majestie to make Leases of his Lands belonging to the Dutchy of Cornwall.
- Citation: 25 Cha. 2. c. 3
- Territorial extent: England and Wales

Dates
- Royal assent: 29 March 1673
- Commencement: 4 February 1673
- Repealed: 30 July 1948
Other legislation
Repealed by	Statute Law Revision Act 1948
Relates to	Duchy of Cornwall Act 1623; Duchy of Cornwall Act 1625; Duchy of Cornwall Act 1661; Duchy of Cornwall Act 1670; Duchy of Cornwall (No. 2) Act 1670; Duchy of Cornwall Act 1685; Duchy of Cornwall Act 1694; Duchy of Cornwall Act 1713; Duchy of Cornwall Act 1715

Status: Repealed

Text of statute as originally enacted

Duchy of Cornwall Act 1685
- Act of Parliament
- Parliament of England
- Long title: An Act to Enable His Majestie to make Grants Leases and Copies of Offices Lands and Hereditaments parcell of His Highnesses Dutchy of Cornwall or annexed to the same and for Confirmation of Leases and Grants already made.
- Citation: 1 Ja. 2. c. 9
- Territorial extent: England and Wales

Dates
- Royal assent: 27 June 1685
- Commencement: 19 May 1685
- Repealed: 30 July 1948
Other legislation
Repealed by	Statute Law Revision Act 1948
Relates to	Duchy of Cornwall Act 1623; Duchy of Cornwall Act 1625; Duchy of Cornwall Act 1661; Duchy of Cornwall Act 1670; Duchy of Cornwall (No. 2) Act 1670; Duchy of Cornwall Act 1672; Duchy of Cornwall Act 1694; Duchy of Cornwall Act 1713; Duchy of Cornwall Act 1715

Status: Repealed

Text of statute as originally enacted

Duchy of Cornwall Act 1694
- Act of Parliament
- Parliament of England
- Long title: An Act for enableing theire Majesties to make Grants Leases and Copies of Offices Lands and Hereditaments Parcell of theire Dutchy of Cornwall or annexed to the same and for Confirmacion of Leases and Grants already made.
- Citation: 5 & 6 Will. & Mar. c. 18
- Territorial extent: England and Wales

Dates
- Royal assent: 25 April 1694
- Commencement: 7 November 1693
- Repealed: 30 July 1948
Other legislation
Repealed by	Statute Law Revision Act 1948
Relates to	Duchy of Cornwall Act 1623; Duchy of Cornwall Act 1625; Duchy of Cornwall Act 1661; Duchy of Cornwall Act 1670; Duchy of Cornwall (No. 2) Act 1670; Duchy of Cornwall Act 1672; Duchy of Cornwall Act 1685; Duchy of Cornwall Act 1713; Duchy of Cornwall Act 1715

Status: Repealed

Text of statute as originally enacted

In 1830, the Whigs argued that revenues from the two duchies of Cornwall and Lancaster should go to the public, but to secure King William IV's support for the Reform Act 1832 (2 & 3 Will. 4. c. 45) they eventually approved the civil list and left the duchies in possession of the royal family. In the 1880s the Duchy comprised 74,000 acres (30,000 hectares).

Parliament debated the two duchies' ownership multiple times, including when Queen Victoria and King Edward VII ascended the throne, respectively. In 1936, leader of the opposition Clement Attlee introduced an amendment to the civil list bill which would have seen the duchies surrendered in exchange for an adjusted annual sum of money tied to the actual cost of royal functions, but the amendment was defeated. In 1971, a private member's bill to nationalise the duchy was defeated, but more than 100 MPs supported it.

Upon Queen Elizabeth II's accession to the throne, the then Prince Charles began receiving £209,000 from the duchy, with duchy authorities stating that it was spent towards his "maintenance and education". In 1969, the government acknowledged that his duchy income was "considerably in excess of his current expenses".

In 1975, Prince Charles established the Duke of Cornwall's Benevolent Fund to benefit south west communities, with revenue coming from the net proceeds from Cornwall bona vacantia. In August 1980 the Highgrove estate was purchased by the Duchy of Cornwall for a figure believed to be between £800,000 and £1,000,000 with funds raised for its purchase by the sale of three properties from the duchy's holdings, including part of the village of Daglingworth in Gloucestershire.

In 1988, West Dorset District Council allocated land in the ducal estate, west of Dorchester, for housing development, which became known as Poundbury. The Duchy Originals company was set up in 1992 to use produce from farms on the ducal estate, with some proceeds going to his charities. Duchy Originals was licensed out to Waitrose in 2009 after losses in 2008. In 2006, Llwynywermod was purchased by the Duchy as a residence for the Duke in Wales.

In 1995, the duchy granted a 99-year lease of the uninhabited islets of the Isles of Scilly, plus the untenanted land on the five inhabited islands, to the Isles of Scilly Wildlife Trust for an annual payment of a single daffodil. On 7 February 2005, the Duchy of Cornwall's finances came under public scrutiny by the House of Commons Public Accounts Committee.

Under the Land Registration Act 2002, the Duchy was required by October 2013 to have filed with the Land Registry mineral rights given to the Duchy in 1337. Some land owners of Talskiddy were surprised that these rights would be expressly inserted into their registers of title upon being informed of the filing in February 2012.

In January 2012, the Duchy purchased a warehouse at Milton Keynes from Waitrose. The Duchy was involved in the Truro Eastern District Centre (TEDC) project. The TEDC project would see a park and ride, a recycling centre, 110 homes and a Waitrose at the junction of Union Hill and Newquay Road. The project received Cornwall Council approval in March 2012, but the Truro Council challenged it in court. This brought questions over the relationship between the Duchy and Waitrose.

In 2013, permission was given for the building of Nansledan, an urban extension to Newquay in Cornwall, which the Duchy had been planning since the early 2000s. Construction began a few months later.

In 2013, the Duchy's office in Cornwall moved from Liskeard to Restormel Manor's old farm buildings. In 2014, the Duchy purchased the southern half of the Port Eliot estate from Lord St Germans. By 2015, Prince William, then Duke of Cambridge, had started attending the twice-yearly Duchy Council. In 2017, the Paradise Papers revealed that the Duchy held investments in offshore funds and companies. The palace later stated that offshore investments had been exited by 2019.

== Property ==
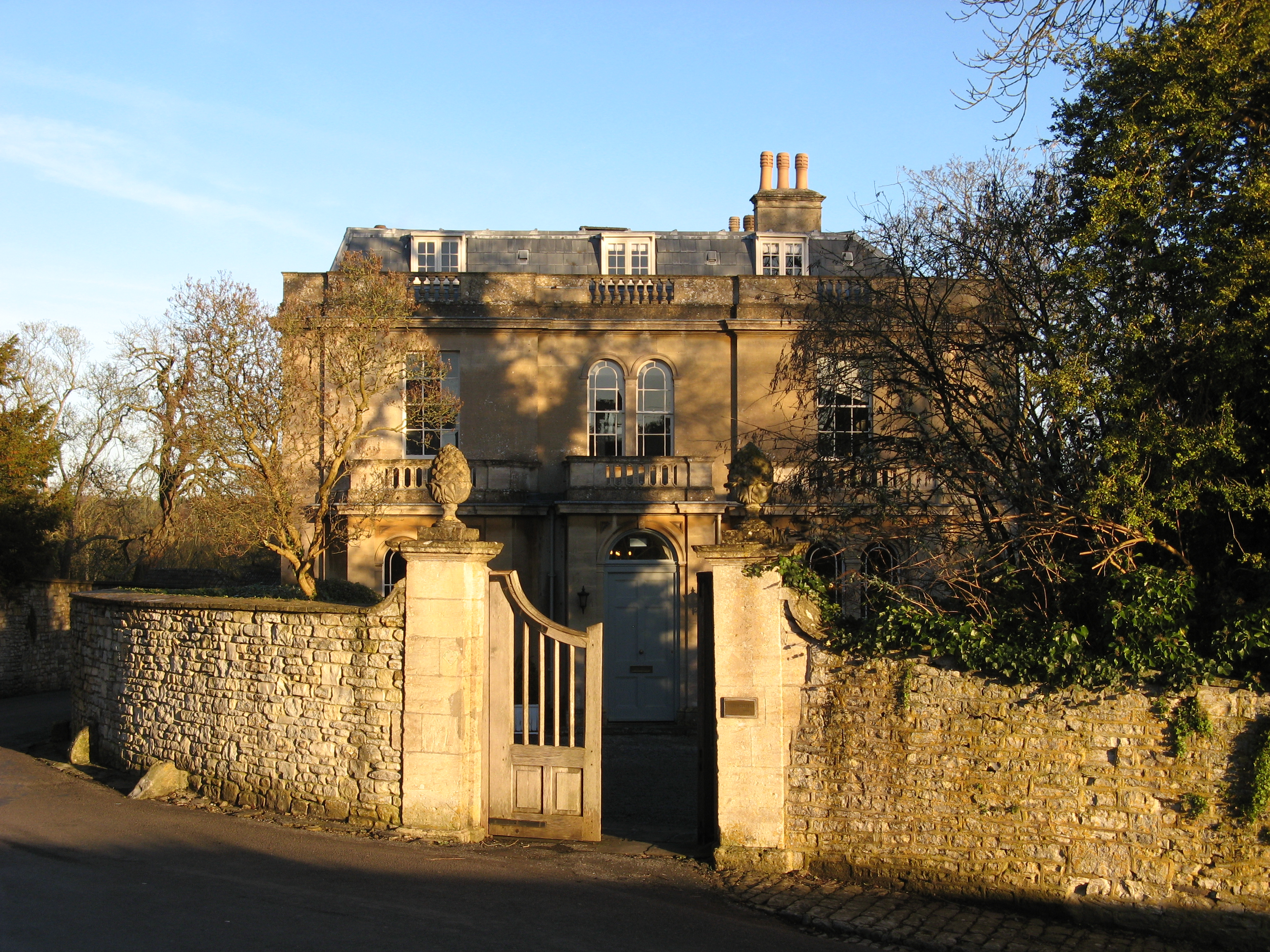
The largest rural portfolio office at Newton St Loe, near Bath. This is the office of the Eastern District, centralised finance and property services, and the Estate Surveyor.

The landholdings of the Duchy of Cornwall throughout southern England and Wales

Forinseca maneria
Type	Name
Honour	Berkhamsted
Honour	St. Valery
Honour	Wallingford
Manor	Byfleet
Fee-farm	City of Exeter
Manor	Lydford
Chace (forest)	Dartmoor (part of Lydford)
Manor and borough	Bradninch
Water and river	Dartmouth
Manor	Meere
Manor	Knaresborough
Manor	Castle Rising
Manor	Cheylesmore
Manor	Kennington
Manor	Fordington

The duchy owns 531.3 square kilometres (205.1 sq mi) – 0.2% of UK land – in over 23 counties, including farming, residential, and commercial properties, as well as an investment portfolio.

By the 17th century, the ducal estates were classified in three groups:

1. Antiqua maneria – the ancient manors of the Earl within Cornwall
2. Forinseca maneria (foreign manors) – those manors outside Cornwall but attached to the duchy by the creation charter
3. Annexata maneria, or annexed manors – those manors added to the Duchy holdings following its creation as a county palatine

The estates are the source of land management work for seven offices:

- London Head Office
- Hereford Office, Dewsall, Hereford
- Eastern District Office, Newton St Loe, Somerset
- Poundbury Office, Poundbury, Dorchester, Dorset
- Western District Office, Restormel Manor, Lostwithiel, Cornwall
- Dartmoor Office, Yelverton, Devon
- Isles of Scilly Office, Hugh Town, Isles of Scilly

Most property is tenanted out, particularly farmland, while the forest land and holiday cottages are managed directly by the Duchy. The estate's holiday cottage business is centred on Restormel Manor, near Lostwithiel.

The Duchy owns The Oval cricket ground in London, which was built on land in Kennington that formed part of the original Duchy estate. The Duchy has ventured into planned development with Poundbury, near Dorchester in Dorset.

=== Planned developments ===
In addition to Poundbury, the duchy is involved with Nansledan, a 540-acre (220-hectare) extension to the coastal town of Newquay, Cornwall. In 2012, work began on a 174-home development at Tregunnel Hill, southwest of Newquay, referred to locally as "Surfbury", after the Poundbury project in Dorset. In December 2013 plans were approved for 800 homes, shops, a supermarket and a primary school. The intention is that Nansledan will evolve into a community of more than 4,000 homes supporting a similar number of jobs.

In February 2024, Prince William, in partnership with Cornish charity St Petrocs, announced plans for building 24 homes on Duchy of Cornwall land in Nansledan to provide temporary accommodation for people experiencing homelessness in the area. Future plans include building more than 400 social rented homes and a further 475 affordable dwellings in South East Faversham.

In March 2026, reports emerged that the duchy intended to sell ten tenant farms on the Bradninch estate in Devon, which had formed part of the duchy since its establishment in 1337. This decision has raised concerns among tenant farmers, while duchy representatives stated that they would be offered "the opportunity to step into ownership, on terms that are significantly advantageous to market terms". In an interview with The Observer, some tenants said they felt betrayed by the current Duke of Cornwall, Prince William, who they believed did not value farmers as much as his father, then Prince Charles, did. In May that year, it was further reported that 20% of the duchy estate would be sold by 2040, as William planned to invest £500 million—funded through land sales, development income, partnerships, and borrowing—towards addressing housing and environmental challenges. Of this, £160 million was allocated to housing initiatives, including the construction of affordable homes in the Isles of Scilly, Cornwall, and Kennington. The duchy also stated that it aimed to facilitate the development of approximately 10,000 to 12,000 homes by 2040. In addition, around £120 million would be committed to reinvestment in workplaces and local infrastructure intended to stimulate economic growth, including plans to expand the industrial park on St Mary's and support entrepreneurship on Dartmoor to improve economic opportunities for young people in the national park. The plans also included a target of delivering 100MW of renewable energy capacity within ten years—sufficient to power up to 100,000 homes—and investing £20 million in environmental recovery programmes, while collaborating with organisations such as wildlife trusts and the Department for Environment, Food and Rural Affairs to help secure more than £200 million for wildlife conservation projects. As part of the £500 million investment, Prince William unveiled the Princetown Community Fund in September 2026 which offers at least £250,000 to support locally led social, economic and environmental projects in Princetown.

== Legal status and additional rights ==
Both the Duchy of Cornwall and the Duchy of Lancaster—since 1399 held by the monarch in a personal capacity—have special legal rights not available to other landed estates: for example, the rules on bona vacantia, the right to ownerless property, operate in favour of the holders of the duchies rather than the Crown, such that the property of anyone who dies in the county of Cornwall without a will or identifiable heirs, and assets belonging to dissolved companies whose registered office was in Cornwall, pass to the duchy.

In 2007, £130,000 was realised from the right of bona vacantia, and given to a charitable fund. The duke owns freehold about three-fifths of the Cornish foreshore and the 'fundus', or bed, of navigable rivers and has right of wreck on all ships wrecked on Cornish shores, including those afloat offshore, and also to royal fish—i.e. whales, porpoises, and sturgeon. The Duchy of Cornwall is the harbour authority for St Mary's Harbour. There are separate attorneys-general for the duchies. The High Sheriff of Cornwall is appointed by the Duke of Cornwall, not the monarch, in contrast to the other counties of England and Wales. The duke had a ceremonial role in summoning the Cornish Stannary Parliament.

In Bruton v. ICO the first tier tribunal found that the duchy was a public authority for the purposes of the Environmental Information Regulations 2004. The Guardian reported in 2011 that, since 2005, the Prince of Wales has been asked to give his consent to a number of draft bills on matters ranging from town planning to gambling, because it could affect the interests of the Duchy of Cornwall. Andrew George, Liberal Democrat MP for St Ives, commented that "The duchy asserts that it is merely a private estate. Most people will be astonished to learn that it appears to have effective powers of veto over the government." Writing in the Guardian, lawyer David Gollancz commented that: "The duchy exercises a unique range of legal powers, which elsewhere are reserved for the crown.... It seems anomalous, and worrying, that such a huge estate, created and conferred by law and exercising significant legal powers, should be able to escape public scrutiny by calling itself a private estate."

The requirement for the Prince of Wales to give consent to draft bills that could affect the interests of the Duchy of Cornwall is not a new power granted to the Prince but a centuries-old parliamentary practice that involved the same requirement for consent being conferred on previous dukes of Cornwall (see Prince's Consent).

For some Cornish activists, Cornwall itself is described, de jure, as a duchy as opposed to an ordinary county, and the duchy estates are distinguished from the duchy itself, having themselves been annexed and united to "the aforesaid duchy". The Royal Commission on the Constitution in 1973 recommended that Cornwall be officially referred to as "the duchy" on what it described as "appropriate occasions" given the nature of the county's "special relationship" with the Crown. The designation is sometimes found used informally in respect of the county as whole.

Historically, all justices of the assizes who visited Cornwall were also permanent members of the Prince's Council, which oversees the Duchy of Cornwall and advises the duke. There are at least three recorded instances in which the prince overruled the king by instructing his officials to ignore or disobey orders issued to them by the King's Chancery.

== Taxation ==
The government considers the duchy to be a Crown body and therefore exempt from paying corporation tax. The tax position of the duchy has been challenged by British republicans. In 2012, following a ruling that the duchy was separate from the Duke himself for the purposes of regulation, Republic (the campaign for an elected head of state) asked HM Revenue and Customs to investigate whether the duchy should still be exempt from tax. The tax exemption is based on the assumption that the duchy estate was inseparable from the tax-exempt person of the Prince of Wales.

Since 1993, the Prince of Wales has voluntarily paid income tax on the duchy income, less amounts which he considers to be official expenditure. Prince Charles paid a voluntary contribution to the treasury of 50% of his Duchy income from the time he became eligible for its full income at the age of 21 in 1969, and paid 25% from his marriage in 1981 until the current arrangement commenced in 1993. Tax is calculated after deducting official expenditure, the biggest source of which was the Prince's staff of about 110 who assisted with his performance of official duties, including private secretaries and a valet working in his office at Clarence House and at Highgrove House. The official expenditure of the Prince of Wales is not audited by the National Audit Office.

== Coat of arms ==
Coat of arms of the Duke of Cornwall
Notes The shield has been in use since around the 15th century and was based on the arms of Richard of Cornwall (1209–1272). Adopted Granted by Royal Warrant on 21 June 1968. Coronet The heraldic shield is ensigned with the Heir Apparent's coronet. Escutcheon Sable, fifteen bezants, five, four, three, two, one. Supporters On either side, a Cornish chough proper supporting an ostrich feather Argent, penned Or. Motto Houmont or Houmout (Middle Low German for "high-spirited").

== Loyal Toast ==
Traditionally, Cornish people refer to the Duke of Cornwall in the Loyal Toast, much like the Duke of Normandy in the Channel Islands, and the Duke of Lancaster in the historical county palatine of Lancaster (Lancashire).

== See also ==
- Cornish corporate heraldry
- Cornish heraldry
- Duchy of Cornwall Act 1844
- List of office holders of the Duchy of Cornwall
- Waitrose Duchy Organic
