= The Prince's Charities =

King Charles' charitable organisations

- Industry: Charity Sector
- Key people: Charles III, President of The Prince's Charities
- Website: princescharities.org

The Prince's Charities is a non-profit organisation that has associations with King Charles III. The Prince's Charities, supported by King Charles III Charitable Fund, is based in the United Kingdom and comprises 19 organisations of which Charles is patron or president, 18 of which were founded personally by him. The name derives from Charles's status as the prince of Wales before his accession on 8 September 2022.

== The Prince's Charities ==
=== Structure ===
Most of the charities are independent of each other and each is run by its own board. Charles is president of all the charities and founded 17 of them; however, as president, he is a figurehead and public face for the charities involved and has no legal responsibility. The aim of The Prince's Charities is "to improve the overall effectiveness of the group, building on shared strengths to ensure their long term success and sustainability." The costs of the office are paid for by King Charles III Charitable Fund.

In autumn 2010, Prince Charles published a book, Harmony: A New Way of Looking at Our World, and produced a film, both articulating the principles and underlying philosophies of many of these charities.

=== Development ===
Through 2003 and 2004, a small office was established within the Office of the Prince of Wales to deal specifically with Prince Charles' charitable work. Sir Tom Shebbeare took up the new position of Director of Charities, with particular responsibility for the development and good governance of the 16 operational charities in which Charles had a particular interest. By the following year, the group had been given a new identity, The Prince's Charities, and the Charities Office had developed new policies and procedures for the group. The Charities Office, set up at Clarence House, employed by 2008 some eight full-time staff. The charities form the largest multi-cause charitable enterprise in the UK and collectively work in 38 countries. They together raise approximately £150 million each year.

In addition to independent charities, Charles established a number of separate charitable initiatives, which include Mosaic, a Muslim youth mentoring campaign; The Prince's Wool Project, to support the UK wool industry; START, to help promote sustainable living; The Cambrian Mountain Initiative, to support the economy in that area of Wales; and The Prince's Rainforest Project, to protect rainforests. In 2011, the Pakistan Recovery Fund was developed, which is intended to support the recovery from the floods seen in that country in 2010.

=== Charities in The Prince's Charities group ===
The charities in The Prince's Charities group are often grouped according to the areas of charitable activity that they are involved with.

Opportunity and enterprise

- The King's Trust
- The King's Trust International
- The King's Trust Australia
- The King's Trust Canada
- The King's Trust New Zealand
- The King's Trust USA
- Youth Business Scotland
- PRIME
- PRIME Cymru
- The Prince's Youth Business International
- The British Asian Trust
- Youth Business Scotland

Education

- Royal Drawing School
- The King's Foundation School of Traditional Arts
- The Prince's Teaching Institute
- Children & the Arts

The built environment

- The Great Steward of Scotland's Dumfries House Trust (renamed The Prince's Foundation in 2018 and then The King's Foundation in 2023)
- The Prince's Foundation for the Built Environment (merged into The Prince's Foundation in 2018)
- The Prince's Regeneration Trust (merged into The Prince's Foundation in 2018)
- The Turquoise Mountain Foundation

Responsible business and the natural environment

- The Royal Countryside Fund
- Business in the Community
- Scottish Business in the Community
- The Cambridge Institute for Sustainability Leadership
- Arts & Business
- In Kind Direct

Closed charities

- The Prince's Foundation for Integrated Health

=== King Charles III Charitable Fund ===
King Charles III Charitable Fund also has a number of wholly owned subsidiary companies: Duchy Originals Ltd, the Prince's Charities Events, and Traditional Arts Ltd. The Highgrove Shop is part of the A.G. Carrick company.
