= Knockroon =

Planned development in East Ayrshire, Scotland

Coordinates: 55.462263°N 4.28308°W

- Location within East Ayrshire
- Language: English; English
- Council area: East Ayrshire
- Country: Scotland
- Sovereign state: United Kingdom
- Post town: Cumnock
- Postcode district: KA18 xxx
- Dialling code: 01290 xxxxxx
- Police: Scotland
- Fire: Scottish
- Ambulance: Scottish

Knockroon is a planned development located between the towns of Cumnock and Auchinleck in East Ayrshire, Scotland. The development was initiated by Prince Charles (later King Charles III) as part of his renovation plans for the nearby Dumfries House estate, which he hoped would regenerate the local economy in this depressed area. East Ayrshire Council granted outline planning permission for 770 houses on 7 December 2009.

The development of Knockroon was expected to continue over a 25-year period, backed by The Prince's Foundation for the Built Environment, and is being designed on green principles. The first houses in the development were built by Hope Homes Scotland and ZeroC. Prince Charles has expressed a personal interest in the development. Construction started in April 2011.

In February 2019 The Scotsman reported that only 31 of the planned 770 homes had been built. In July 2022, The Sunday Times reported that the project's value "was written down from £15 million to £700,000". A leading Scottish architect, Professor Alan Dunlop, described the prince's vision as an "imported pastiche" and a "curious mix" of relatively expensive homes dropped into a rural setting that should have never been built.

In July 2022, a spokesman for the Office of the Scottish Charity Regulator said "we can confirm that the work of Havisham Group and property transactions relating to the Knockroon development in Ayrshire forms part of our overall investigation, work on which is ongoing." Between 2012 and 2017, Havisham Properties, owned by Lord Brownlow of Shurlock Row, purchased 11 properties for £1.7 million on the Knockroon development. Brownlow had been a trustee of The Prince's Foundation between 2013 and 2018, serving for a period as Chairman.

== See also ==
- Poundbury
- Nansledan
