= Caribbean Spring =

Irish-bred Thoroughbred racehorse

- Sire: Dark Angel
- Grandsire: Acclamation
- Dam: Bogini
- Damsire: Holy Roman Emperor
- Sex: Gelding
- Foaled: 4 March 2013
- Country: Ireland
- Colour: Bay
- Breeder: Rangefield Bloodstock
- Owner: The Bean Club
- Trainer: George Margarson
- Record: 57: 5-4-7
- Earnings: £26,963

Caribbean Spring also known as Bean (foaled 4 March 2013) is an Irish-bred, British-trained Thoroughbred racehorse and social media sensation.

Caribbean Spring is a bay gelding with a white star and was bred in Ireland. His dam Bogini won four races in Ireland and Britain as a two and three-year-old. His sire is Dark Angel, making him a half-brother to sprinter Battaash. He went into training with Dermot Weld on the Curragh and ran seven times in Ireland as a two-year-old. He was ridden on six occasions by Pat Smullen and once by Leigh Roche. His best placing was a fourth at Cork in October 2015.

After his two-year-old season, Caribbean Spring was sold by owner Ronan Lambe at Tattersalls. Bought by a syndicate for 9,000 guineas, he joined the yard of trainer George Margarson at Graham Lodge in Newmarket. The syndicate disappeared without paying for him, but the Margarson family decided to keep him. His first race in Britain was at Yarmouth in June 2016, where he was ridden by apprentice jockey Jane Elliott. His first win came on 3 May 2017 when, ridden by Elliott, he beat the favourite by a short head to win an apprentice handicap on the all-weather track at Wolverhampton. The pair went on to win another two races back-to-back at Wolverhampton the following season, with trainer George Margarson saying: "We thought we were going to win two or three with him last year, but he has probably taken a bit more time to develop mentally – Jane has learned how to ride him though". Trainer's daughter and amateur jockey Rosie Margarson secured a win with Caribbean Spring on the all-weather track at Southwell in November 2018. Four days earlier they had won a charity race (not under rules) at Ascot in aid of The Prince's Countryside Fund.

Caribbean Spring ran only three times in 2020, winning at Chelmsford City with apprentice Georgia Dobie, and then coming second at Wolverhampton with Rosie Margarson and second at Chelmsford City with apprentice Georgia Cox. The following two years, 2021 and 2022, were disappointing, with Caribbean Spring only being placed once in thirteen starts. In October 2022 it was announced that he would be retiring from racing as he was developing arthritis in his legs, but would stay in training at Graham Lodge as a lead horse for the Margarson string. On 29 October 2022 he appeared for a farewell racecourse gallop with Rosie Margarson on Newmarket Racecourse at the end of the day's racing, accompanied by Tom Queally on stable-mate Ropey Guest (known as Chubby).

Rosie Margarson rides Caribbean Spring out on Newmarket Heath and captures his antics on camera, posting them to Twitter, Instagram and TikTok. As of September 2021 they had nearly 6,000 followers on Twitter under the handle "@LifeOfBean", 25,000 on Instagram and 163,000 on TikTok. On the Newmarket gallops, Caribbean Spring is often accompanied by Ropey Guest (Chubby), 40/1 winner of the 2023 Clipper Handicap at York.

During National Racehorse Week 2021 Caribbean Spring was selected to feature in the Racing Post in an article about the daily life of a veteran racehorse. He was described as "something of a social media sensation".
