= Douglas Connell =

British lawyer (born 1954)

Douglas Andrew Connell (born May 1954) is a retired Scottish solicitor and former chairman of Museums Galleries Scotland, which is the national development body for Scotland's museums and galleries. He is also the former chair of The Prince's Foundation

Connell was Senior Partner and most recently a consultant to the private client law firm Turcan Connell of which he was one of the founders. He was chairman and latterly deputy chairman of Tcam, an investment management and financial planning business. His work in charity law included the formation and governance of charities and advice to the trustees of a number of major national institutions as well as private charitable foundations. He also specialised in the national heritage.

Connell is a former chairman of the recognition committee of Museums Galleries Scotland, the Edinburgh International Book Festival and the lottery committee of the Scottish Arts Council. He has served as a board member of various arts and heritage organisations including the Scottish Arts Council, Artlink, the Edinburgh International Cultural Summit Foundation, the Historic Scotland Foundation and the Edinburgh International Festival. For many years he was a member of the Scottish Committee of the Historic Houses Association. He also served as a General Council Assessor on the Court of the University of Edinburgh and is a trustee of many other public and charitable organisations. Connell served as a board member of Hampshire Cultural Trust. In 2016, he was appointed as a Trustee of the Great Steward of Scotland's Dumfries House Trust. He then became the Deputy Chair and then the Chair of The Prince's Foundation and other related charities. In 2021, he resigned as Chair as a result of claims the charity had accepted a £200,000 donation from Russian convict, Dmitry Leus, with the prince thanking the businessman in a letter and suggesting a meeting. This led to an investigation by the Scottish Charity Regulator.

A former member of the Court of the University of St Andrews, Douglas chaired the Audit Committee and the Governance and Nominations Committee.

At the Scottish Legal Awards 2015, Connell received the Lifetime Achievement Award. In 2015, Connell was awarded an honorary doctorate by Heriot-Watt University. In 2016, Connell was made an Honorary Academician of The Royal Scottish Academy.

After many years in Scotland and 7 years in Hampshire, Connell now lives in Surrey. He continues his involvement in Scotland as a Trustee of several grant making charitable trusts with a focus on the arts in Scotland.
