= David Brownlow, Baron Brownlow of Shurlock Row =

British entrepreneur, philanthropist and life peer (born 1963)

The Right Honourable The Lord Brownlow of Shurlock Row CVO DL

Member of the House of Lords
- Lord Temporal
- Life peerage 9 October 2019

Personal details
- Born: David Ellis Brownlow; 16 September 1963 (age 63) Liverpool
- Party: Conservative
- Education: Newcastle Polytechnic

David Ellis Brownlow, Baron Brownlow of Shurlock Row, CVO DL (born 16 September 1963) is a British entrepreneur, Conservative Party donor, philanthropist and life peer. He sits as a member of the House of Lords and served as Vice-Chairman of the Conservative Party from July 2017 until July 2020.

He is the founder of The David Brownlow Charitable Foundation and a trustee of the Royal Albert Hall Trust. He was appointed Deputy to the Lord Lieutenant of Berkshire in January 2018.

== Early life ==
Born in Liverpool, Brownlow graduated in economics from Newcastle Polytechnic, and spent two years as a policeman with Thames Valley Police based in Slough.

== Business career ==
Brownlow co-founded the recruitment firm Huntswood in 1996 and in 2013 co-founded a private equity firm, Havisham, through which over £20 million has been invested. Havisham is one of the biggest investors in Cefinn, a fashion label founded by Samantha Cameron, the wife of David Cameron. Brownlow was described as Cameron’s "white knight" rescuer as Cefinn was losing more than £500,000 a year when Brownlow took a 10% stake in 2018.

== The Prince's Foundation ==
Brownlow was a trustee of The Prince's Foundation between 2013 and 2018, serving for a period as Chairman. Between 2012 and 2017, Havisham Properties, owned by Brownlow, purchased 11 properties for £1.7 million on the Knockroon development, a site originally acquired as a piece of farmland by Prince Charles when he bought nearby Dumfries House, and intended to become an eco-village. Dumfries House Trust also awarded Brownlow's company a £1.2 million construction contract. In July 2022, a spokesman for the Office of the Scottish Charity Regulator said "we can confirm that the work of Havisham Group and property transactions relating to the Knockroon development in Ayrshire forms part of our overall investigation, work on which is ongoing." Brownlow was appointed a Commander of the Royal Victorian Order (CVO) in the 2018 Birthday Honours. The Prince's Foundation said "Lord Brownlow was appointed CVO in recognition of his role of chair of The Prince's Foundation for Building Community."

== Politics ==
He was nominated for a life peerage in Theresa May's resignation honours and was created Baron Brownlow of Shurlock Row, of Shurlock Row in the Royal County of Berkshire, on 9 October 2019 and introduced to The House on 15 October 2019. In figures released by the Electoral Commission, it was shown that he was one of the Conservative Party's biggest donors, giving the party almost £3 million (£714,690 in 2017 alone). Brownlow’s company Huntswood Associates Ltd paid a total of £112,549 to the supplier responsible for the refurbishment of the flat above 11 Downing Street, where Prime Minister Boris Johnson, his wife, Carrie, and their children live. Johnson has since repaid more than £110,000 of these costs. By the end of December 2021, sources with knowledge of the matter indicated to the press that the prime minister is expected to be cleared of breaking the ministerial code with regard to the £58,000 of flat improvement expenses which remained under scrutiny.

Orders of precedence in the United Kingdom
Preceded by The Lord Choudrey	Gentlemen; Baron Brownlow of Shurlock Row	Followed by The Lord Davies of Gower
