= Youth Business Scotland =

Youth Business Scotland is a programme provided by The King's Trust Scotland. It funds and supports young people to startup and grow a business. It provides advice and financial support for young people between 18 and 30 who would like to start their own business. It is one of The Prince's Charities.

The Youth Business Scotland programme was formed in 2012 by the merger of the then Prince's Trust Scotland and sister charity The Prince's Trust Youth Business Scotland (formerly The Prince's Scottish Youth Business Trust; PSYBT). The Prince's Trust Scotland had been established in 2000 when The Prince's Trust (later renamed The King's Trust in 2020s) was devolved into English, Northern Ireland, Scottish and Welsh organisations. PSYBT had been established in 1989 by King Charles III (then Prince of Wales).

Previous businesses that have been supported include BrewDog, MJM International and Lingo24.
