= Business in the Community =

British business-community outreach charity

- Type: Non-profit organization
- Founded: 1982
- Headquarters: London
- Key people: Charles III, President; Gavin Patterson, Chairman; Kieran Harding, CEO
- Revenue: 18,101,881 pound sterling (2019)
- Number of employees: 272 (2019)
- Website: Business in the Community

Business in the Community (BITC) is a British business-community outreach charity promoting responsible business, CSR, corporate responsibility, and is one of the Prince's Charities of King Charles III (formerly the Prince of Wales). BITC works with companies through voluntary initiatives, guidance and network to support responsible business practices and strengthen CSR within organisations. They have also played a broader role in the development of voluntary corporate responsibility in both the UK and internationally.

BITC works with companies in the UK and internationally.

== Background ==
Business in the Community office at 83 Bournville Lane, Birmingham

BITC was set up in 1982 and its current CEO is Kieran Harding. Prior to this, Mary Macleod was the CEO from 2023 to 2025. Amanda Mackenzie OBE was the CEO from 2016 to 2023. Dame Julia Cleverdon was CEO from 1992 to 2008 and is now vice president, and Stephen Howard was CEO from 2008 to 2016.

Each of BITC's campaigns is managed by a leadership team, made up and chaired by senior business leaders. Leaders include Steven Holliday, chief executive of National Grid plc; Mark Allen, chief executive of Dairy Crest Group; Paul Drechsler, chairman and chief executive of Wates Group; Richard Howson, chief executive of Carillion, and Ian Cheshire, CEO of Kingfisher plc.

Business in the Community is one of The Prince's Charities, a group of not-for-profit organisations of which Charles III is president. Seventeen of the nineteen charities were founded personally by The Prince

== Role in responsible business ==
=== Development and influence ===
Business in the Community emerged as an important part of the development of voluntary corporate responsibility in the UK during the early 1980. The organisation worked together with companies to encourage them to take greater social responsibility through voluntary initiatives, network and guidance rather than rules and direct regulation. This contributed to BITC becoming a part of the broader development of CSR in the UK and influencing how companies approached social responsibility and responsible business.

BITC's influence was not only limited to the UK. A CSR- model developed from the organisation has also been used and adapted in other countries, which indicate that BITC's work have had a broader international influence.The model was structured around workplace, environment, marketplace and community and has been used or adapted in several different countries. For example, In Malaysia similar principles were used as part of a broader national approach to CSR. This shows that BITC's ideas has also been applied outside of the UK context.

BITC has also helped in the creation or expansion of similar networks and organisations for corporate responsibility in several countries, including Ireland, Australia and Spain.

=== How BITC works with companies ===
BITC works with companies mainly through voluntary cooperation and support, rather than formel requirements and sanctions. In a study of BITC Wales the organisation is described as an employer forum where companies can receive guidance, exchange experiences and learn from each other and work with benchmarking. This indicates that BITC is trying to influence companies through network and soft regulation where participation is voluntary.

BITC also supports companies through tools, such as CORE accreditation, which can help companies structure and develop their work with CSR. This reflects one way on how the organisation works with companies in order to help them integrate responsible business in their operation. Employee engagement can also be important for how CSR is implemented in organisations using CORE accreditation.

=== Outcomes and limitations ===
BITC's work has also been evaluated through an UK government-funded programme focused on humanitarian response. The evolution shows both positive outcomes and limitations. Collaboration between companies and Non-Governmental Organizations increased, while a digital tool designed to match companies with NGOs did not achieve the expected results. BITC and the responsible authority therefore decided to adjust parts of the project.

A broader limitation of voluntary CSR is that companies can choose how far they want to go beyond what is required by law. In the UK, there are still areas where CSR principles are not fully integrated into legislation, which can create gaps where companies technically follow the law but still do not live up to broader social and environmental responsibilities.

This is relevant for BITC because the organisation's work is largely based on encouraging companies to take responsibility through voluntary guidance and initiatives. The results can therefore also depend on companies' willingness to actually follow these principles.

== Related activities ==
=== The Responsible Business Awards ===
Business in the Community launched the Awards for Excellence at its AGM in December 1997. They are presented annually to businesses that are judged to show innovation, creativity and a sustained commitment to corporate responsibility.

=== The King's Seeing is Believing (SIB) ===
The King's Seeing is Believing programme was started by the then Prince of Wales in 1990, by inviting business people to go on visits around the county. Some 8,000 chief executives have led visits tackling subjects such as urban homelessness and illiteracy to challenges facing hill farmers in remote areas.

Participants reported back to the Prince in person. The original report-back was held in December 1990 at a club in North Kensington, and for many years afterwards participants reported back in annual sessions at St James's Palace or a similar venue. According to The Times in 1993, one visit by senior hotel executives to see homelessness in London led Ladbroke to hand over its disused Vernons football pools headquarters in Liverpool to be turned into a hostel and training centre for young homeless people; the Prince visited the Homeground Partnership, based in a Ladbroke building on Scotland Road, on 8 December 1992.

=== Opportunity Now ===
Founded in October 1991, and supported by the then Prime Minister John Major MP, Opportunity Now is a UK membership organisation working towards gender equality and diversity in the workplace.

The campaign's chair Helena Morrissey, CEO of Newton Investment Management and founder of the 30% Club, was appointed in 2013.

=== The British Business Excellence Awards (BBEA) ===
in 2023, BITC announced working with BBEA as their Awards partner. The awards were for UK-based businesses across industries to celebrate businesses that have championed sustainability, diversity, equality and transcended expectations and limitations throughout the year. The awards programme is referred to as the Lloyds Bank British Business Excellence Awards.

=== Northern Ireland Responsible Business Awards ===
The annual awards were announced in 2023 in an aim to showcase transformational business stories who demonstrate strength, inclusive leadership and rebuilding of the planet. There were 12 categories;

- NI Responsible Company of the Year, sponsored by Encirc
- Climate Action, sponsored by Heron Bros
- Collaborative Action, sponsored by Arthur Cox
- Diversity and Inclusion (a focus on recruitment), sponsored by Belfast Harbour
- Education Partnership, sponsored by Allen and Overy
- Employer of Choice (a focus on retention and development), sponsored by Ulster University
- Impacting your Community, sponsored by SPAR NI
- One-to-Watch
- Responsible Product/Service, sponsored by Translink
- Responsible Technology Innovation, sponsored by Allstate NI
- Responsible Business Ambassador, sponsored by SSE Airtricity
- Wellbeing at Work, sponsored by Larne Port
