= Poundbury =

Experimental planned community in Dorset, England

Coordinates: 50.713°N 2.466°W

- Queen Mother Square, with Strathmore House (right)

- Location within Dorset
- Population: 4,100
- OS grid reference: SY671549
- Civil parish: Dorchester
- Unitary authority: Dorset
- Ceremonial county: Dorset
- Region: South West
- Country: England
- Sovereign state: United Kingdom
- Post town: DORCHESTER
- Postcode district: DT1
- Dialling code: 01305
- Police: Dorset
- Fire: Dorset and Wiltshire
- Ambulance: South Western
- UK Parliament: West Dorset

Poundbury is an experimental urban extension on the western outskirts of Dorchester in the county of Dorset, England. The development is led by the Duchy of Cornwall, and had the keen endorsement of King Charles III when he was Prince of Wales and Duke of Cornwall. Under the direction of its lead architect and planner Léon Krier, its design is based on traditional architecture and New Urbanist philosophy. The 2021 census showed a population of 4,100.

Due for completion in 2028, it is expected to house a population of 6,000. There are 2,000 people in more than 180 businesses engaged in its development and construction. Poundbury has been praised for reviving the low-rise streetscape built to the human scale and for echoing traditional local design features, but it has not reduced car use, as originally intended. A 2022 report said: "Poundbury has been highlighted for its pedestrian and public transport links and not being as 'car-based' as other developments across the country."

== Mission ==
Poundbury has been built according to the principles of Charles III, who is known for holding strong views challenging post-war trends in town planning that were suburban in character. Since starting in 1993, the town has received both criticism and praise from architects and design critics.

The development is built to a high-density urban pattern, intent on creating an integrated community of shops, businesses, and private and social housing; there is no zoning. The planners claim they are designing the development around people rather than the car and aim to provide a high-quality environment. To avoid constant construction, utilities are buried in common utility ducts under the town. Common areas are maintained by a management company to which all residents belong. It consists of 35 percent social housing and is designed for sustainable development, which includes carbon neutrality.

To some degree, the project shows similarities with the contemporary New Urbanism movement. The development brief outlined having a centre built in a classical style and outer neighbourhood areas in a vernacular style, with design influences derived from the surrounding area. The development includes period features such as wrought iron fences, porticos, gravelled public squares, and 'bricked-up' windows; known as blind windows, these traditionally serve an aesthetic function and are widely misattributed to the window tax.

== History ==
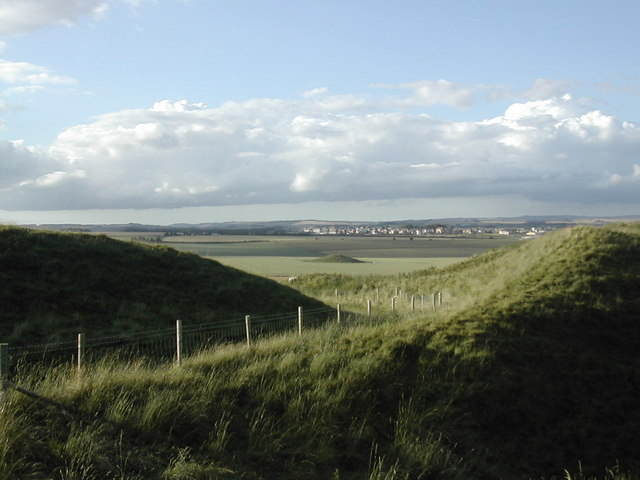
Poundbury as seen from Maiden Castle in 2006

In 1987, the land was included in the West Dorset District Council local plan as a preferred location for development to expand the town of Dorchester. Charles III, the then-Prince of Wales and Duke of Cornwall, had already taken an interest in architecture and urban design, and was writing his book A Vision of Britain: A Personal View of Architecture. Seeing an opportunity to put the Prince of Wales's ideas into practice, the Duchy of Cornwall chose to lead on planning the development itself, rather than sell the land to an established housebuilder. Driehaus Prize-winning New Classical architect Léon Krier was hired in 1988 to design the development.

Construction commenced in 1993, and is expected to be complete around 2028, with the north-west quadrant being the last built. The final configuration is projected to support approximately 5,800 people.

Greetings card entrepreneur Andrew Brownsword sponsored the £1 million development of the market hall at Poundbury, designed by John Simpson and based on early designs, particularly the one in Tetbury.

In June 2023, King Charles III and Queen Camilla visited Poundbury for the first time since their coronation in May. During their visit they unveiled bronze reliefs of themselves on a plinth located at Queen Mother Square and inaugurated the Duke of Edinburgh Garden where they also unveiled a bust of the King's father Prince Philip, the Duke of Edinburgh.

== Economy and employment ==
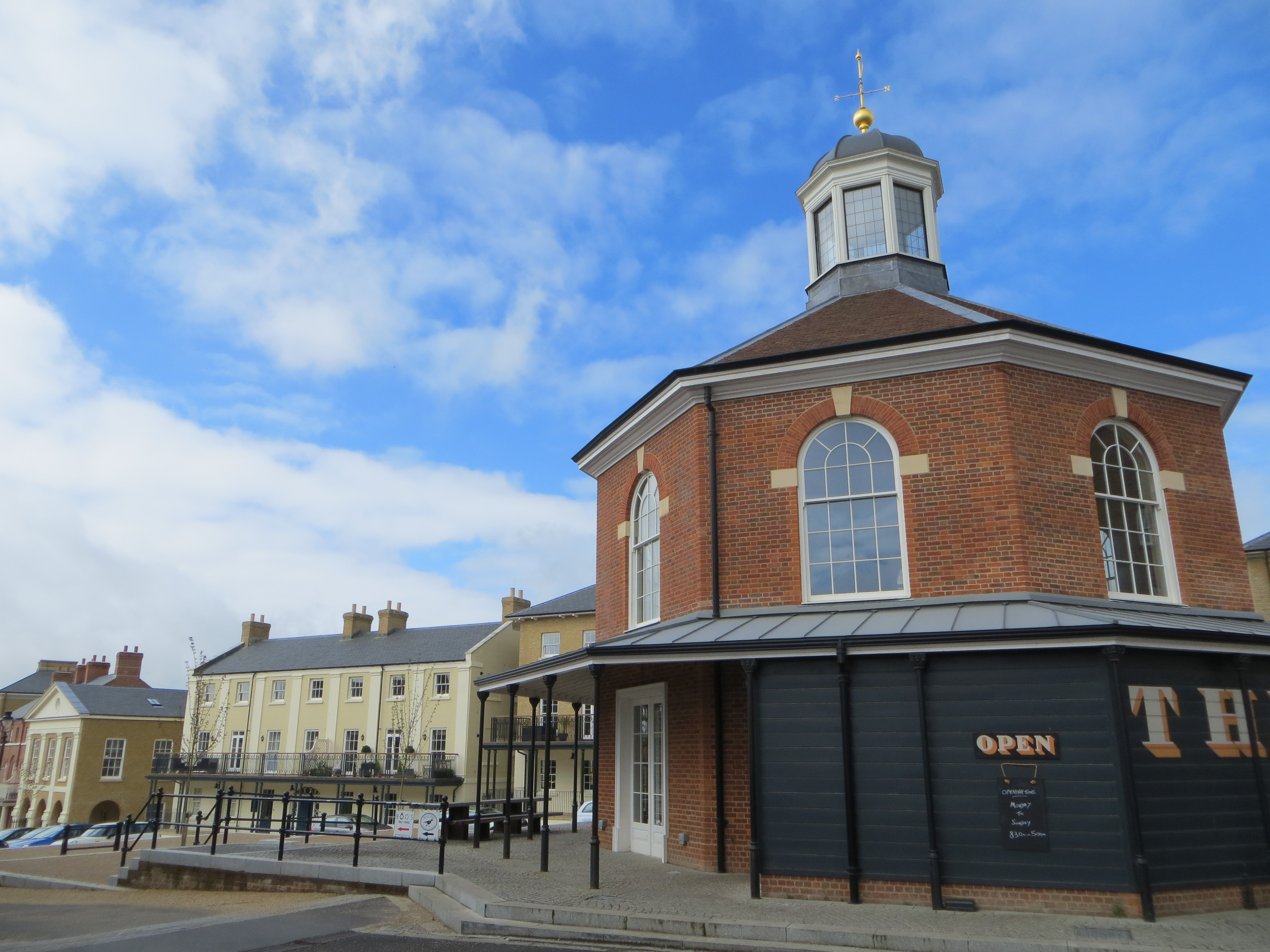
Butter Cross bakery

A 2010 study by Dorset County Council found Poundbury's annual contribution to the local economy was then £13 million and projected to reach £20 million by 2025; more than 2,000 Poundbury residents were working in 180 local businesses. In 2017, the number of businesses increased to 185, providing 2,345 jobs. Businesses include a Waitrose store, a company that produces parts for aeroplane wings, and a chocolate factory.

Dorset Cereals employed more than 100 people at a purpose-built barn factory from 2000 until 2019, when it moved production from Poundbury to Poole. In 2018 The Daily Telegraph reported space for about 80 additional businesses.

== Education ==
Poundbury has two primary schools in the catchment area: The Prince of Wales and Damers First School. The latter was an existing school in Dorchester, but in 2017 relocated to Poundbury where a new school building was constructed.

== Demographics ==
The 2021 national census showed a population of 4,100. In 2021, 89.5% of the population was born in the United Kingdom and 10.5% born outside. The ethnic makeup of the town in 2021 was 93.7% White (White British or White Other), 2.4% Asian, 0.9% Black, 2.6% Mixed or of multiple ethnic groups and 0.4% of other ethnic group.

== Attractions and landmarks ==
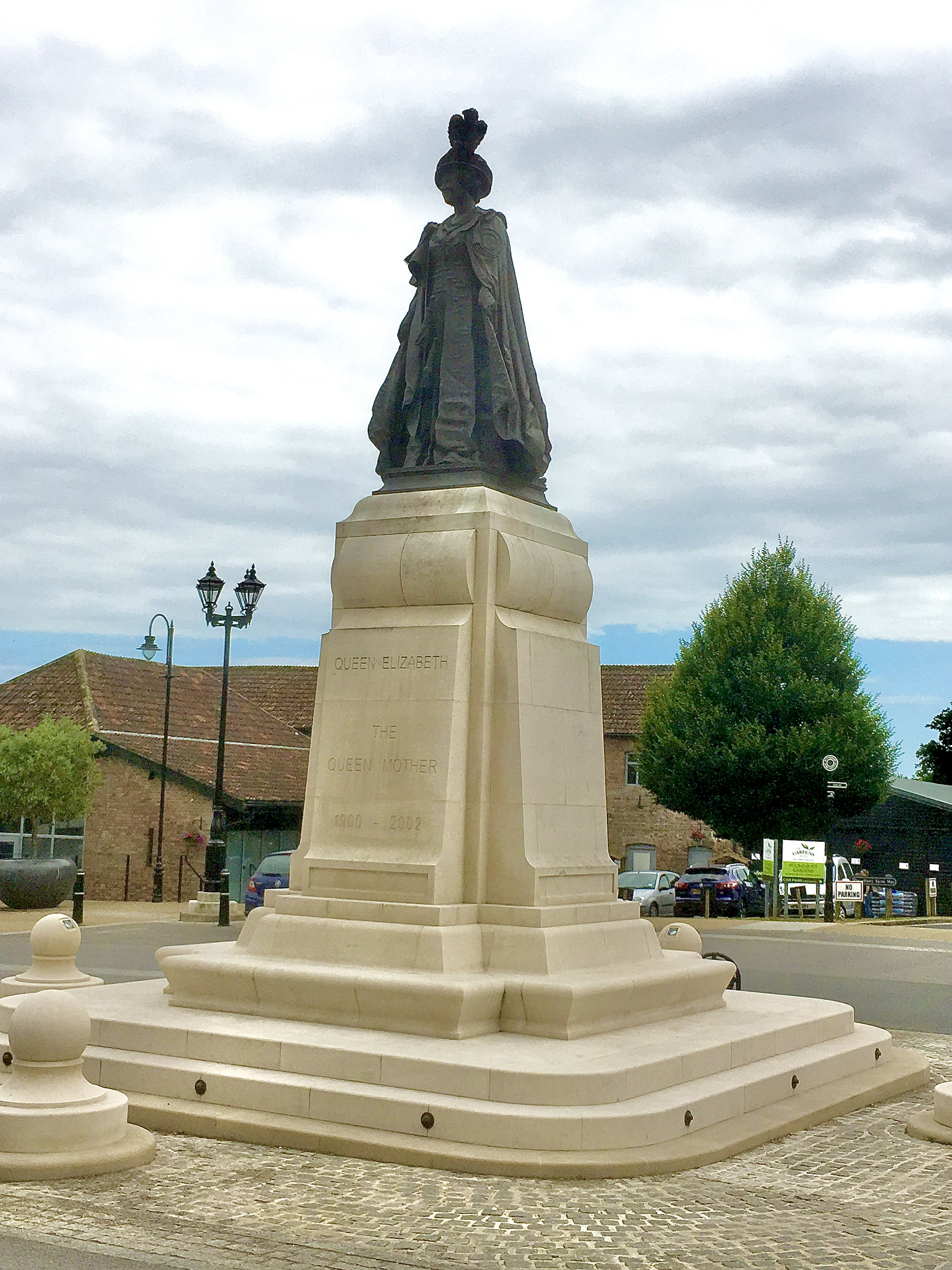
Queen Mother Square

Due to Poundbury's unique appearance and plan, the town has been visited by architects, government officials, planners, housebuilders, and developers from around the world.

The Queen Mother Square is surrounded by tourist attractions, such as Strathmore House, named in honour of King Charles' grandmother Queen Elizabeth the Queen Mother's paternal heritage. In 2016, the Queen Mother statue was unveiled at the square by Elizabeth II and her husband, Prince Philip, Duke of Edinburgh. Also in 2016, a pub named the Duchess of Cornwall Inn was opened in honour of the later Queen Camilla.

Every year in August, the Dorset Food & Arts Festival is held at Queen Mother Square attracting thousands of people. The festival showcases the town's fine produce and arts and also raises money for charities.

In 2018, the Prince of Wales officially opened Poundbury's first church, the Dorchester Community Church.

In May 2022, the Prince of Wales formally opened a huge play area in Poundbury's largest park, the Great Field. The Great Field is now a park under the care of Dorchester Town Council.

== Politics ==
Poundbury has two tiers of local government: the Dorchester civil parish and above that the Dorset unitary authority. The Dorchester Poundbury ward elects one member to Dorset Council, and four of the 20 members of Dorchester's town council.

For elections to the House of Commons, Poundbury is part of the West Dorset constituency. The current Member of Parliament (MP) is Edward Morello of the Liberal Democrats.

== Reception ==
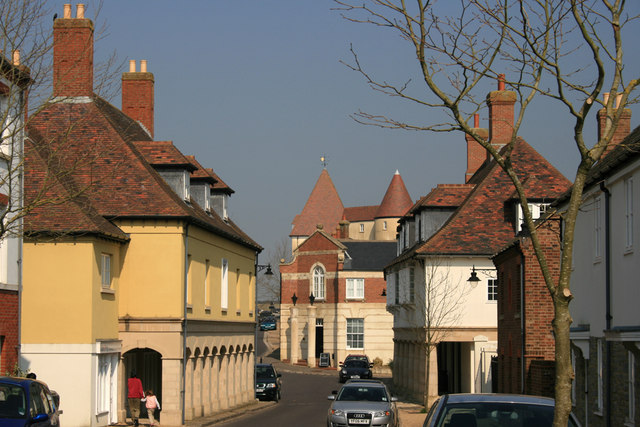
Middlemarsh Street

Poundbury's street plan and aesthetics have been variously praised and criticised by several commentators. Writing in Architect magazine, Professor Witold Rybczynski said that "Poundbury embodies social, economic, and planning innovations that can only be called radical." Poundbury was intended to reduce car dependency and encourage walking, cycling, and public transport. A survey conducted at the end of the first phase, however, showed that car use was higher in Poundbury than in the surrounding (rural) former district of West Dorset; but a 2022 report said "Poundbury has been highlighted for its pedestrian and public transport links and not being as 'car-based' as other developments across the country."

Among the critics, Stephen Bayley described it as "fake, heartless, authoritarian and grimly cute". In 2009, Dorchester Fire Station, designed by Calderpeel Architects, was shortlisted for the Carbuncle Cup award for ugly buildings. According to Simon Jenkins, "Many architects felt Poundbury was a comment on their failings – as it was – and deploring it became a badge of honour".

Nonetheless, the project has also received praise. In 2013, on the 20th anniversary of the project, the New Urbanist publication Better Cities and Towns wrote that it was "winning converts". A few years later, British architecture and design critic Oliver Wainwright of The Guardian wrote, "Poundbury, the Prince of Wales's traditionalist village in Dorset, has long been mocked as a feudal Disneyland. But a growing and diverse community suggests it's getting a lot of things right." He argued that its main success was achieving genuine mixed-use development. Jenkins argued that while Poundbury had been "initially ersatz and frigid", it had "matured" and been more successful than earlier new towns. Countering criticisms of Poundbury's aesthetics, English philosopher Sir Roger Scruton praised the town for its commitment to pre-modern architectural and planning principles. In the BBC documentary Why Beauty Matters, Scruton exclaimed that "the proportions [of Poundbury] are human proportions; the details are restful to the eye. This is not great or original architecture, nor does it try to be; it is a modest attempt to get things right by following patterns and examples laid down by tradition. This is not nostalgia, but knowledge passed on from age to age."

== Gallery ==
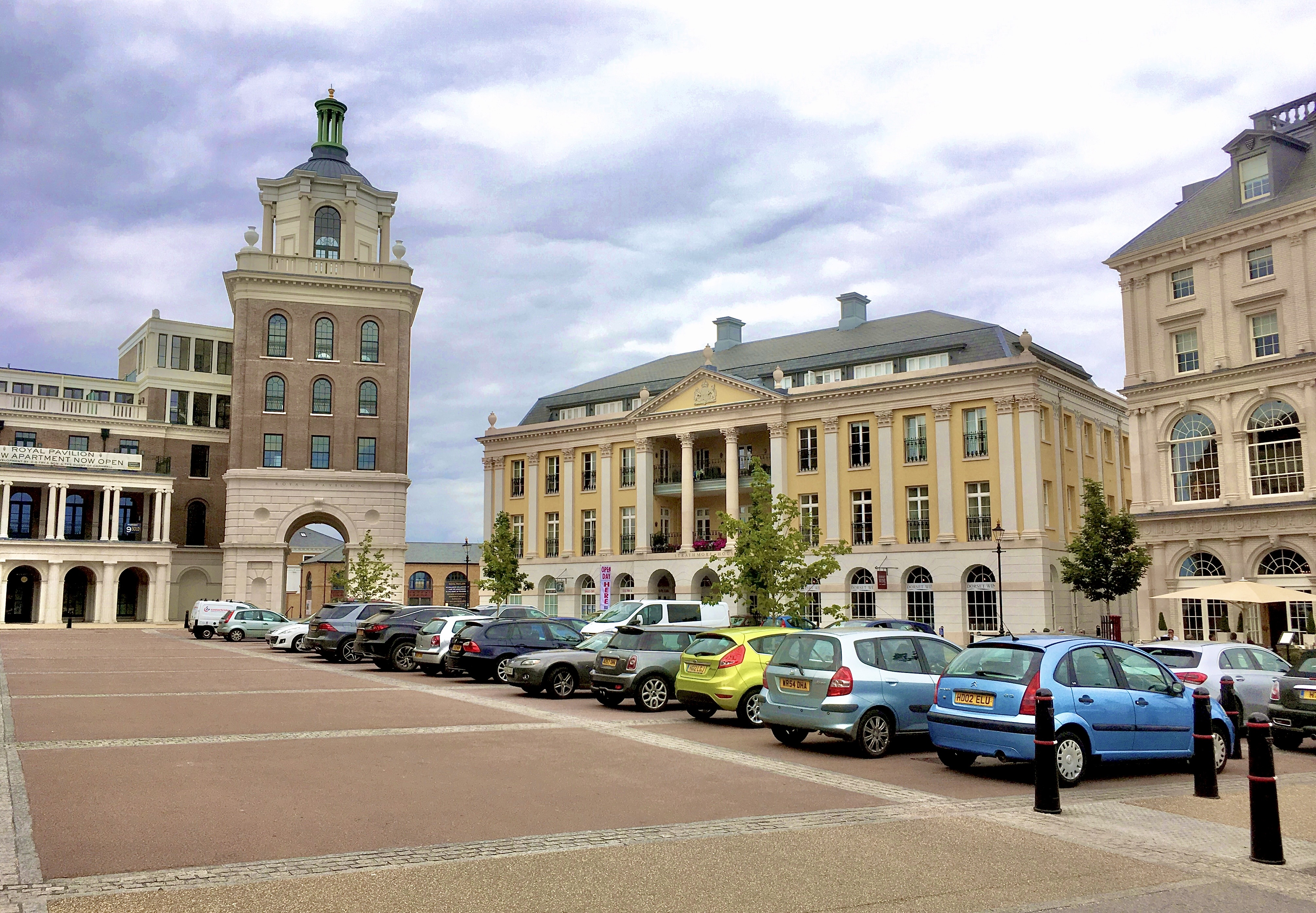
Queen Mother Square

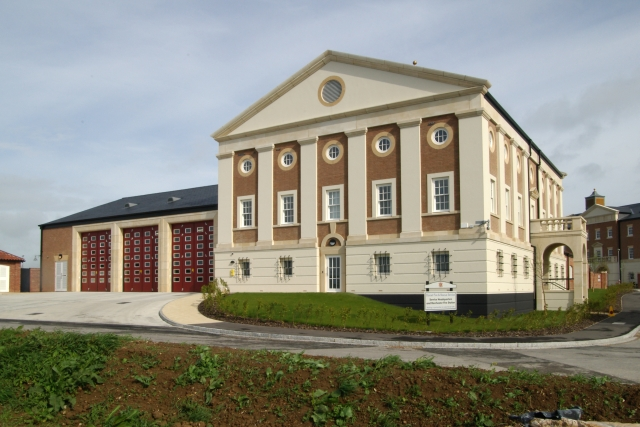
Fire station by Calder Peel (Dorset & Wiltshire Fire and Rescue Service)

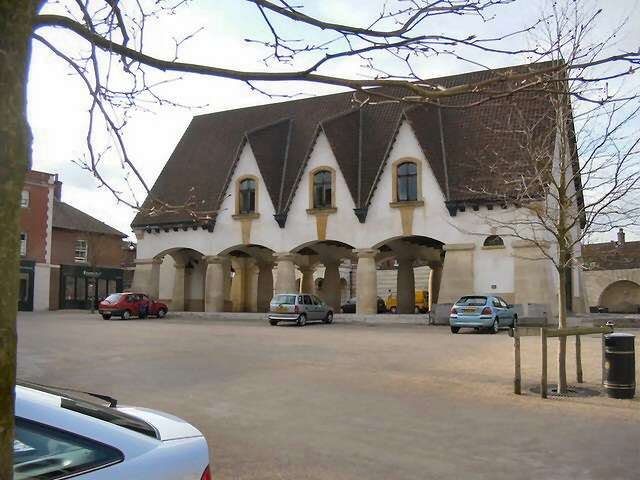
Brownsword Hall (front) by John Simpson (compare Tetbury Market House)

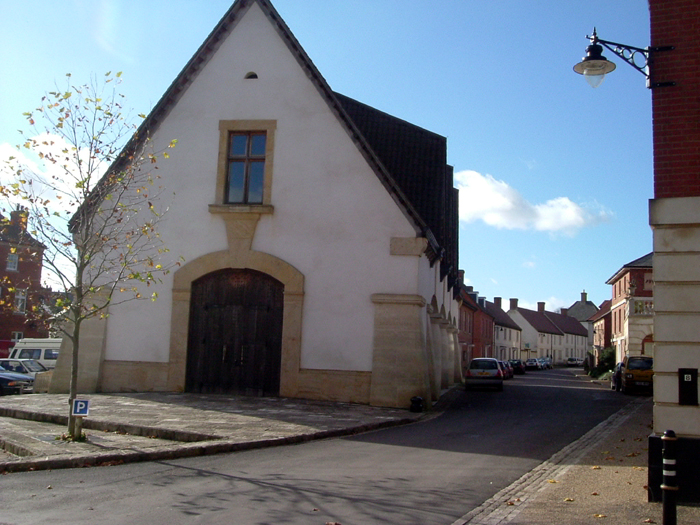
Brownsword Hall (side)

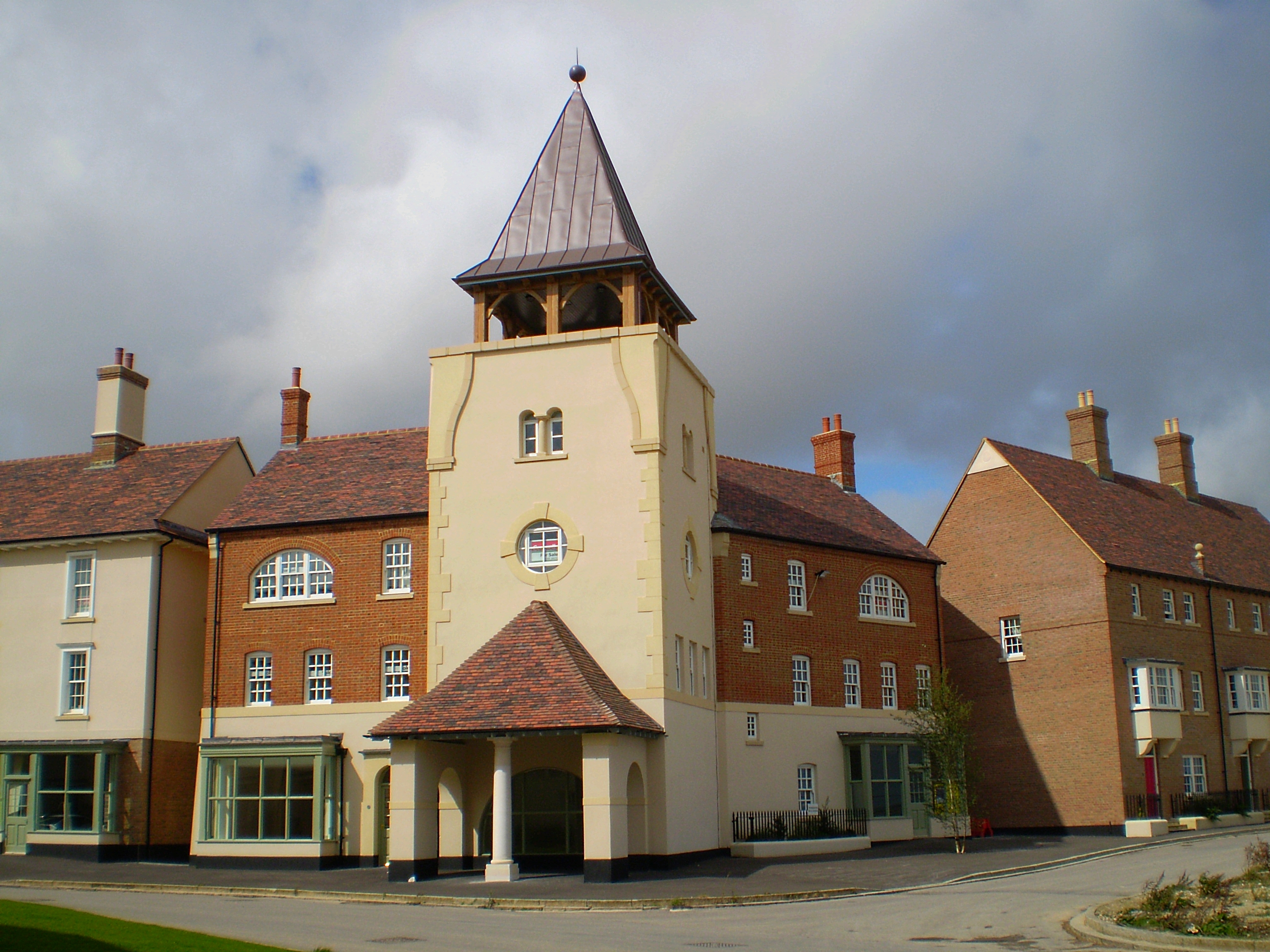
Peverell Ave W / Ringhill Street (Whistling Witch)

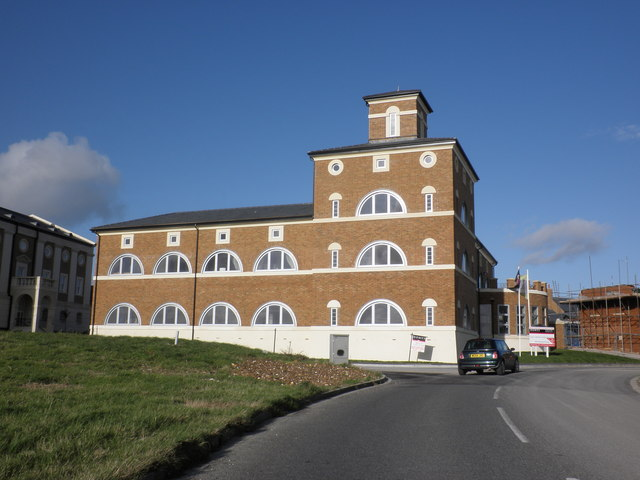
Peverell Ave W / Peninsula Way

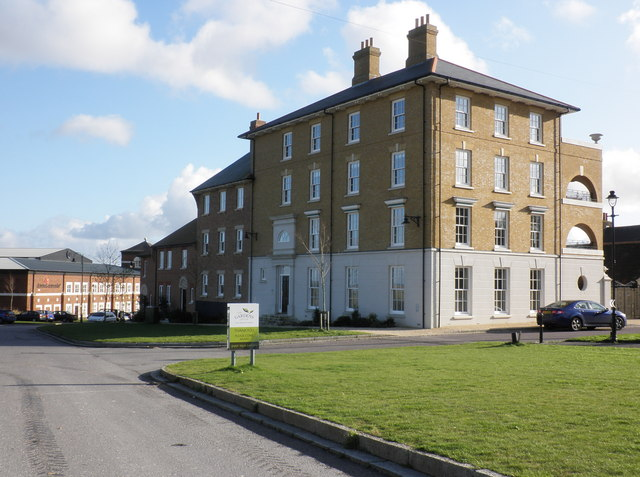
Peverell Ave E / Woodlands Crescent

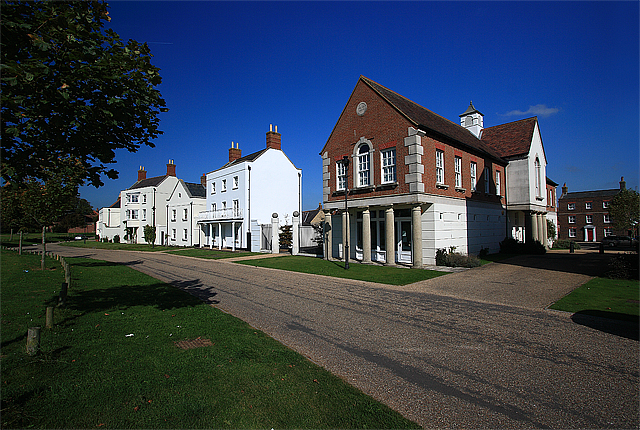
Holmead Walk / Chaseborough Square

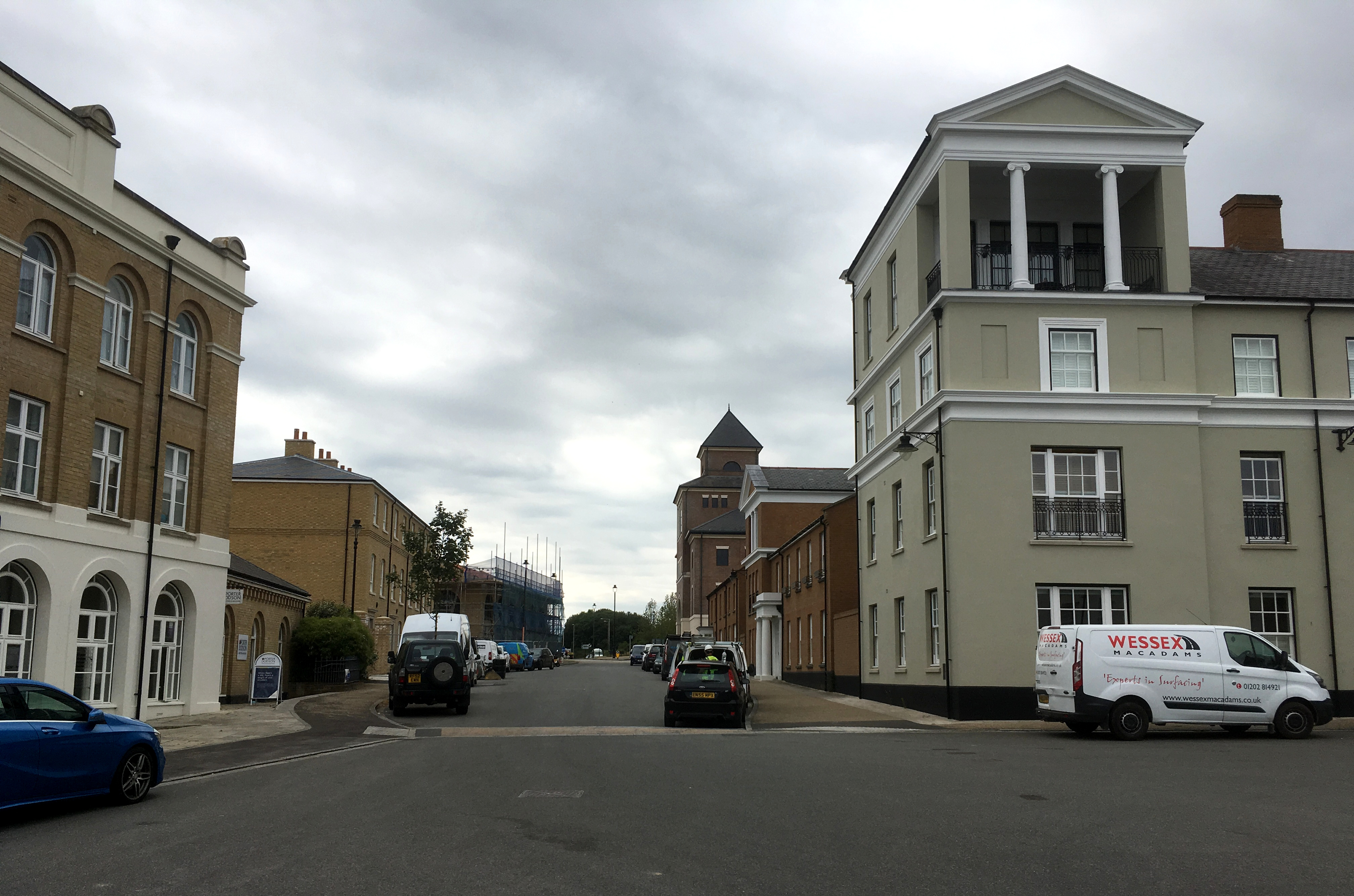
Bridport Road / Beechwood Lane

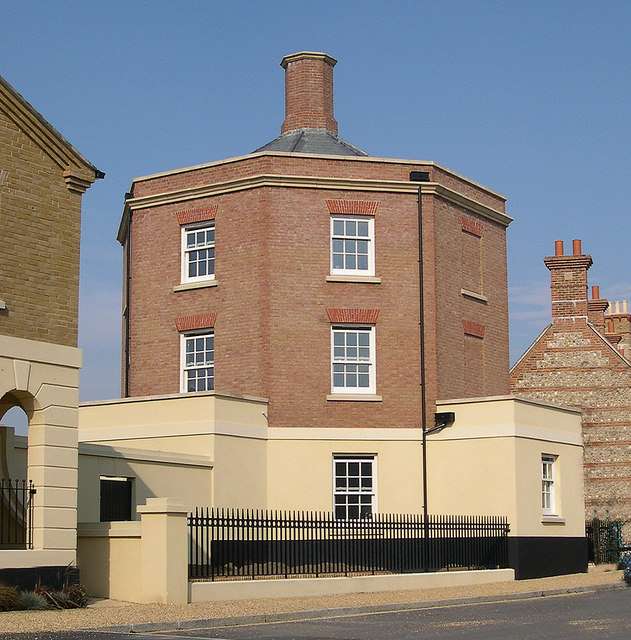
Moraston Street / Weir End Road

== See also ==
- Fairford Leys – a similar project located on the edge of Aylesbury
- Poundbury Hill – an Iron Age hill fort near Poundbury
- Driehaus Architecture Prize
- Knockroon – a similar project in Scotland
- Nansledan – a similar project with Duchy of Cornwall involvement beside Newquay
