= The King's Foundation School of Traditional Arts =

Coordinates: 51.5258°N 0.0812°W

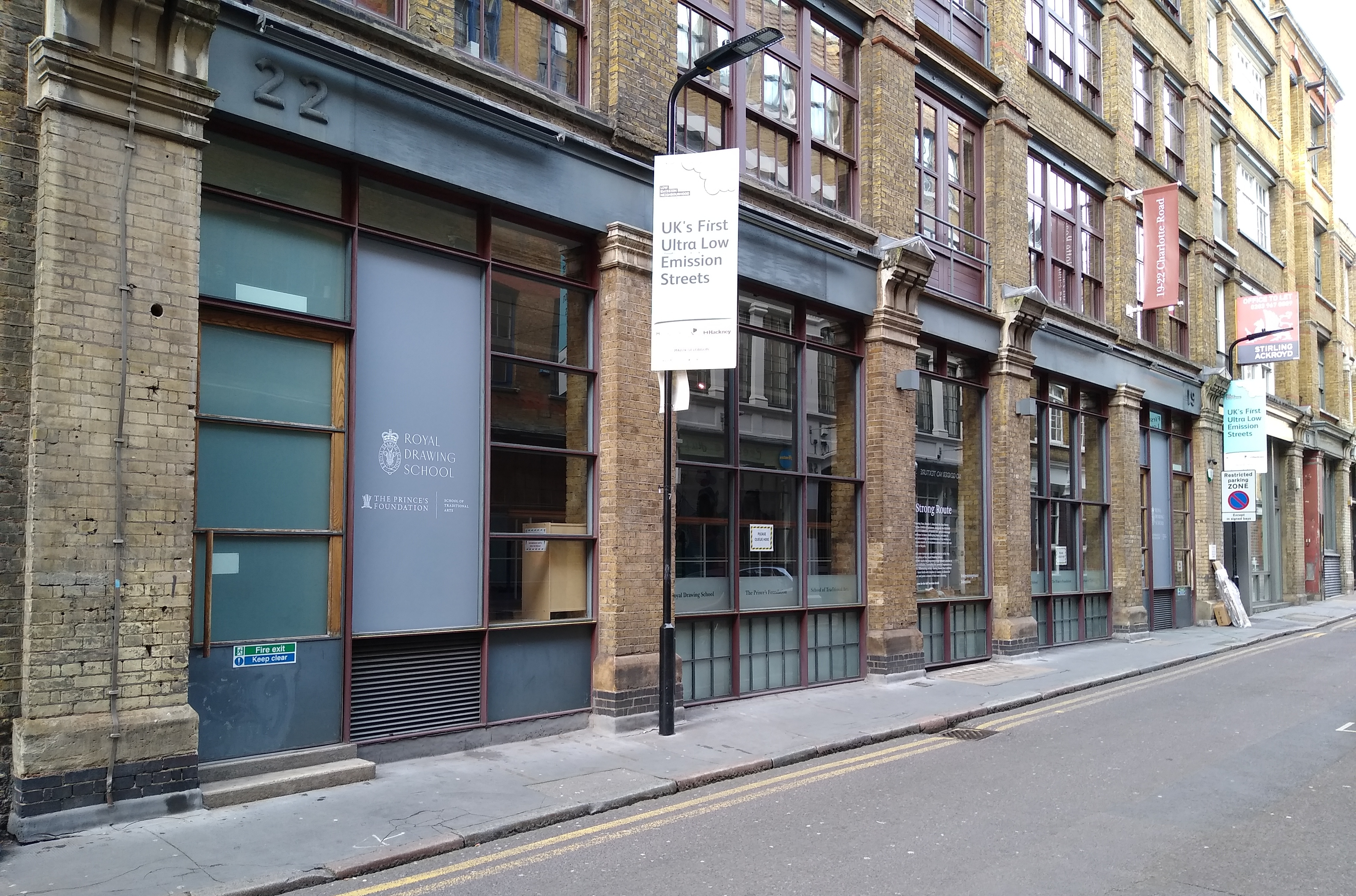
The King's Foundation School of Traditional Arts

The King's Foundation School of Traditional Arts is a school in London that teaches students at the postgraduate degree level, through short open courses and in the community. The school was founded in 2005 by King Charles III (then Prince of Wales) as part of The Prince's Charities group, with the aim "to continue the living traditions of the world's sacred and traditional art forms".

== Philosophy ==
The School is believed to be unique among art schools: although there are many theoretical programmes in western universities at the graduate and postgraduate level, there are no colleges apart from the School where the practical skills of the Islamic and traditional arts are taught at this level.

The School strives to preserve global traditional arts and traditions under threat of extinction.

== Building ==
Based in Shoreditch, an average of 25 students work permanently on site, numbers increasing with students studying PhDs and open courses.

== History ==
The School was originally established as the Visual Islamic and Traditional Arts Programme (VITA) at the Royal College of Art in 1984. It was the brainchild of Keith Critchlow, the Professor Emeritus at the School, who is also the author of several books on sacred geometry.

The Programme transferred to The Prince of Wales' Institute of Architecture in 1993 which subsequently became incorporated into The Prince's Foundation in 2000. The School was initiated as a separate charity of Charles in April 2004.

In 2018, the School became a part of the Prince's Foundation, merging with The Prince's Foundation for Building Community, The Prince's Regeneration Trust, The Great Steward of Scotland's Dumfries House Trust.

In 2018, works created by graduates of the School and two other charities founded by King Charles were put on display during the Prince & Patron exhibition to mark his 70th birthday.

== Postgraduate degrees ==
Three postgraduate degrees are offered by the school: a Master of Arts (MA), a Master of Philosophy degree (MPhil) and Doctor of Philosophy (Ph.D.) in arts practice research in the traditional arts. All degrees are awarded by University of Wales Trinity Saint David.

== See also ==
- Ethnic groups in the United Kingdom
- Islamic geometric patterns
- Multiculturalism in the United Kingdom
- The Royal Drawing School
