= Bach flower remedies =

Solutions of brandy and water

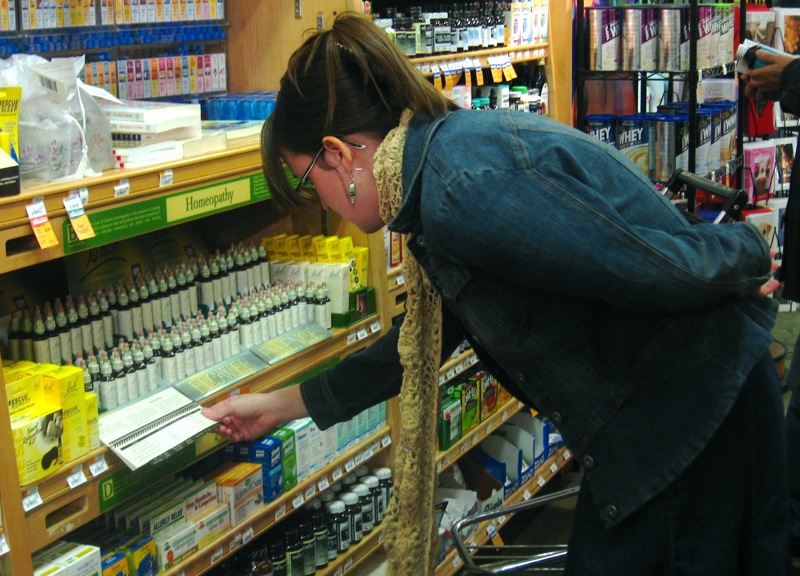
Woman browsing a shelf containing Bach flower remedies

Bach flower remedies (BFRs) are solutions of brandy and water—the water containing extreme dilutions of flower material developed by Edward Bach, an English medical doctor, in the 1910s. Bach stated that the dew found on flower petals retains the supposed healing properties of that plant. The hypothesis that flower remedies are associated with effects beyond a placebo response is not supported by data from rigorous clinical trials.

== Description ==
The Bach flower remedy solutions contain a 50:50 mix of water and brandy, and are called mother tincture. The solutions do not have a characteristic scent or taste of the plant because of dilution. The dilution process results in the statistical likelihood that little more than a single molecule may remain; it is claimed that the remedies contain "energetic" or "vibrational" nature of the flower and that this can be transmitted to the user.

== Effectiveness ==
In a 2002 database review of randomized trials Edzard Ernst concluded:

The hypothesis that flower remedies are associated with effects beyond a placebo response is not supported by data from rigorous clinical trials.

All randomized double-blind studies, whether finding for or against the solutions, have suffered from small cohort sizes, but the studies using the best methods found no effect over placebo. Perhaps, the probable means of action for flower remedies is as placebos, enhanced by introspection on the patient's emotional state or being listened to by the practitioner. The act of selecting and taking a remedy may act as a calming ritual.

A systematic review in 2009 concluded:

Most of the available evidence regarding the efficacy and safety of BFRs has a high risk of bias. We conclude that, based on the reported adverse events in these six trials, BFRs are probably safe. Few controlled prospective trials of BFRs for psychological problems and pain exist. Our analysis of the four controlled trials of BFRs for examination anxiety and ADHD indicates that there is no evidence of benefit compared with a placebo intervention.

A newer systematic review published in 2010 by Ernst concluded:

All placebo-controlled trials failed to demonstrate efficacy. It is concluded that the most reliable clinical trials do not show any differences between flower remedies and placebos.

Flower remedies are sometimes promoted as being capable of boosting the immune system, but, according to Cancer Research UK, "there is no scientific evidence to prove that flower remedies can control, cure or prevent any type of disease, including cancer".

== Use ==
Each solution is used alone or in conjunction with other solutions, and each flower is said by advocates to impart specific qualities. Remedies are usually taken orally.

The best known solution product is the Rescue Remedy combination, which contains an equal amount each of rock rose, impatiens, clematis, star of Bethlehem, and cherry plum remedies. Rescue Remedy is a trademark, and other companies produce the same formula under other names, such as Five Flower Remedy.

== Philosophy ==
Bach believed that illness resulted from a conflict between the purposes of the soul and the personality's actions and outlook. According to Bach, this internal war leads to negative moods and "energy blocking", thought to cause a lack of "harmony", causing physical diseases.

Bach derived his solutions intuitively and based on his perceived psychic connections to the plants, rather than using research based on scientific methods. If Bach felt a negative emotion, he would hold his hand over different plants, and if one alleviated the emotion, he would ascribe the power to heal that emotional problem to that plant. He imagined that early-morning sunlight passing through dewdrops on flower petals transferred the healing power of the flower onto the water, so he would collect the dew drops from the plants and preserve the dew with an equal amount of brandy to produce a mother tincture which would be further diluted before use. Later, he found that the amount of dew he could collect was not sufficient, so he would suspend flowers in spring water and allow the sun's rays to pass through them. If this was impractical because of lack of sunlight or other reasons, he wrote that the flowers may be boiled. The result of this process Bach termed the "mother tincture", which is then further diluted before sale or use.

Bach was satisfied with the method, because of its simplicity, and because it involved a process of combination of the four elements:

The earth to nurture the plant, the air from which it feeds, the sun or fire to enable it to impart its power, and water to collect and be enriched with its beneficent magnetic healing.

By his death in 1936 at 50 years of age, Bach had created a system of 38 different flower remedies and their corresponding theories of ailments.
