= King Charles III Charitable Fund =

Grant making organisation

- Formation: 1979; 47 years ago
- Founder: Charles III
- Type: Charity
- Location(s): 3 Orchard Place London, England SW1H 0BF
- Region served: United Kingdom and the Commonwealth; Greece; Romania
- Website: kccf.org.uk
- Formerly called: The Prince of Wales's Charitable Fund

King Charles III Charitable Fund (KCCF), formerly known as The Prince of Wales's Charitable Fund, is a United Kingdom-based charity fund. It provides grants to charity organisations in the United Kingdom and internationally. Grantee organisations vary in focus but fall under the umbrella of one of the fund's designated funding themes.

The fund was founded by King Charles III, then Prince of Wales, in 1979. At King Charles III's accession, the fund adopted its new name.

== Overview ==
The fund is primarily a grant-making organisation, running both large and small grants programs. The Trustees oversee all grant-making, and award grants across the following funding themes:

- Heritage and Conservation
- Education
- Health and Wellbeing
- Social Inclusion
- Environment
- Countryside

By early 2023, the charity had donated £73 million to different causes since its establishment in 1979. In January 2023, it was announced that seven charities would receive £1.95 million from KCCF over three years.

== Trustees ==
- Sir Ian Cheshire (Chair)
- Louise Casey, Baroness Casey of Blackstock DBE
- Sir Ken Olisa
- Ms. Kristin Rechberger
- The Hon. Mrs. Sarah Jane Butler-Sloss
- Mrs. Colleen Harris MVO
- Mr. Ranan Dasgupta

== Subsidiaries ==
=== Accounting for Sustainability (A4S) ===
Founded by King Charles III, Accounting for Sustainability was a subsidiary of KCCF until 31st March 2026. The organisation was incubated by KCCF from 2004 to 2026. Accounting for Sustainability (A4S) encourages the responsible business community to recognize the benefits of considering the environment and wider society as part of their day-to-day business decisions and establish a global framework for integrated corporate reporting. It has three main aims, inspire finance leaders, transform financial decision-making, and scale up action, to transition into a sustainable economy. A4S gained charitable status in 2021.

=== The Royal Countryside Fund (RCF) ===
The Royal Countryside Fund was a subsidiary of KCCF until September 2023. RCF works towards creating a sustainable future for the UK countryside. It supports family farmers and rural communities through grant making and training programmes, such as the Farm Resilience Programme, which provides free business skills training to family farmers. Over the past decade, the PCF has invested more than £10 million in over 400 projects, helping to empower rural communities across the UK.

The Fund is also active in helping new entrants into farming and rural enterprise, and aims to provide young people with the skills they need to ensure that the countryside remains a living, breathing place for farmers in the future.

=== KCCF Trading Limited (formerly Duchy Originals Limited) ===
Duchy Originals Limited changed its name to KCCF Trading Limited in 2025. It was set up as a company by the then Prince of Wales in 1990, and is one of the largest organic food brands in the UK. Duchy Originals focuses on good food, good farming and good causes in a 'virtuous circle'. The Duchy Organics range is sold exclusively through Waitrose. Each year, the royalties from the range are donated to KCCF and distributed to not-for-profit organisations through grants programmes. Since 2009, global sales of Waitrose Duchy Organic products have contributed more than £50 million, supporting good causes across the UK and in more than 20 countries internationally.

=== The Prince of Wales's Foundation Romania ===
The Prince of Wales's Foundation Romania was closed in January 2026.

== Donations ==
=== Vardanyan donations ===
In 2007, Prince Charles personally intervened to stop the sale of Dumfries House, which was about to be sold for £45 million. While he raised some of the money required through other charities, a major element of the financial package was a £20 million loan backed by The Prince's Charities Foundation. A plan was developed to have the estate become a self-sufficient enterprise. The project was to be achieved through donation and sponsorship of various renovation projects around the estate, as well as through revenues from the construction of an 'eco-village' in the grounds, a planned community called Knockroon. The 2008 financial crisis had a major impact on the project, affecting the prospects for the Knockroon development and thus the recouping of the £20 million loan.

To get out of the financial hole, the foundation managed to raise £5 million from private donors, including Ruben Vardanyan, a Russian banker from Armenia. Vardanyan's charities stated that both he and his wife were approached in 2013 to gather a group of sponsors that could help with funding the renovation of a run-down farm building near the estate's west entrance and turning it into an upmarket guest house. One wing of the guest house would have 16 luxury guest rooms and the project was funded by donors, some of whom were wealthy associates of Vardanyan. He also led the investment bank Troika Dialog that managed a network of 70 offshore companies moving billions out of Russia, details of which were exposed through the Organised Crime and Corruption Reporting Project. In 2009, 2010, and 2011 the Prince's Charities Foundation received $100,000, $41,000, and $61,000 respectively via the now-defunct bank Ūkio bankas in Lithuania to help restore Dumfries House. The payments were from a company called Quantus Division Ltd, which was itself part of the network of aforementioned offshore companies.

Vardanyan responded to the incident by stating that while he was chief executive, he was also a private client of Troika Dialog and any donations to the Prince's Charities Foundation were from his personal funds. Clarence House insisted that Prince Charles was not directly involved in the foundation's operations around fundraising. A spokesman for The Prince of Wales's Charitable Foundation and The Dumfries House Trust stated the charities had applied robust due diligence processes and no red flags arose at the time.

=== Qatari donations ===
In June 2022, The Times reported that between 2011 and 2015 King Charles accepted €3 million in cash from the Prime Minister of Qatar, Hamad bin Jassim bin Jaber Al Thani. The funds were said to be in the form of €500 notes, handed over in person in three tranches, in a suitcase, holdall and Fortnum & Mason carrier bags. Charles' meetings with Al Thani did not appear in the Court Circular. Coutts collected the cash and each payment was deposited into the accounts of The Prince of Wales's Charitable Fund. Fawcett's salary in this fund was 95,000 GBP per annum. A Clarence House spokesperson stated that the appropriate covenants were carried out, and it was the "donor's choice" to make the donations in cash, after which the trustees "discussed the governance and donor relationship" and the auditors "signed off on the donation after a specific inquiry during the audit". There is no evidence that the payments were illegal or that it was not intended for the money to go to the charity. The Charity Commission announced they would review the information and determine if "there is any role for the Commission in this matter". In July 2022, the Charity Commission announced that they would not be launching an investigation into the donations as the information submitted had provided "sufficient assurance" that due diligence had taken place.

=== Bin Laden family donations ===
In July 2022, The Times reported that in 2013 The Prince of Wales's Charitable Fund had received a donation of £1 million from Bakr bin Laden and Shafiq bin Laden, both half-brothers of Osama bin Laden, the founder of militant organization al-Qaeda that was responsible for the September 11 attacks who had been disowned by his family. Charles was reportedly introduced to Bakr bin Laden in June 2000 at an exhibition in London, and he was present at a banquet during Charles's visit to Riyadh. The two met about two weeks after the September 11 attacks at a dinner organised months earlier by the Oxford Centre for Islamic Studies, one of Charles's patronages that has links to the Bin Laden family, to discuss the Islamic faith. Charles is said to have held a private meeting with Bakr bin Laden at Clarence House on 30 October 2013. The Prince of Wales's Charitable Fund responded by stating that "the decision to accept the donation was taken wholly by the trustees", and "due diligence was conducted, with information sought from a wide range of sources, including government". The Charity Commission described the decision to accept donations as a "matter for trustees" and added that based on the available information no investigation was required.

== See also ==
- The King's Trust
- The King's Foundation
- The Royal Countryside Fund
