= Nansledan =

New suburb of Newquay in Cornwall, England

Coordinates: 50.413°N 5.040°W

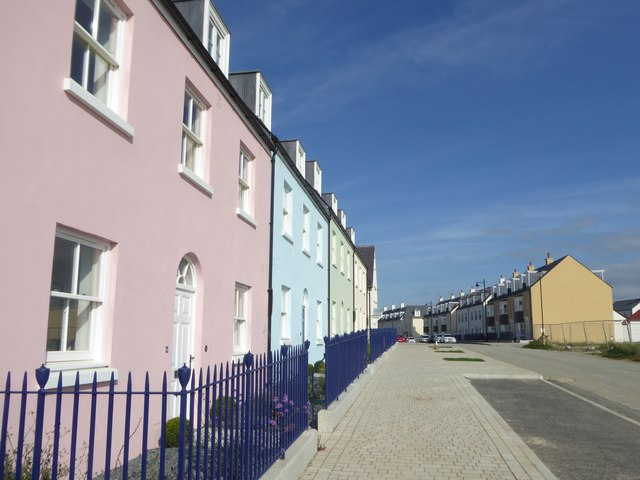
- Nansledan housing (2019)

- Location within Cornwall
- OS grid reference: SW839614
- Civil parish: Newquay
- Unitary authority: Cornwall
- Ceremonial county: Cornwall
- Region: South West
- Country: England
- Sovereign state: United Kingdom
- Post town: Newquay
- Postcode district: TR7
- Dialling code: 01637
- Police: Devon and Cornwall
- Fire: Cornwall
- Ambulance: South Western
- UK Parliament: St Austell and Newquay

Nansledan (Cornish: Nansledan, meaning wide valley) is a major new suburb of Newquay in Cornwall, England. Nansledan has been developed by the estate of the Duchy of Cornwall since 2013, with residents first occupying their homes in 2015. The development, officially described as 'an extension of Newquay', had the endorsement of King Charles III during his time as Duke of Cornwall.

Nansledan is expected to have up to 3,700 homes once completed, with 30% affordable homes, some operated as shared ownership.

== History ==
The project was started in 2013 and initially attracted the nickname Surfbury, a mix of Poundbury, created by the Duchy of Cornwall in the 1990s, and the fact that Newquay is regarded as the British 'capital' of surfing. The development was named Nansledan, inspired by the area in which it is built. Nansledan means Broad Valley in Cornish, a theme which continues in the street names and the school (Skol Nansledan – which means Nansledan school.)

Nansledan will have a Market Street with shops, while Nansledan school opened in September 2019. (Note: It was officially opened by the Prince of Wales in March 2020, but had welcomed its first pupils in September 2019 to coincide with the start of the school year.) It will cater for 420 pupils, and had 152 when it opened.

Building materials have come mainly from three Cornish quarries:

- Slate from Trelivett Quarry near Tintagel
- Granite, used in kerbs, paving, lintels and window sills from De Lank Quarry at Bodmin
- Roofing slate from Delabole Quarry

The first residents moved into Nansledan in 2015.

In his 2018 report on Nansledan, "A Place to Call Home", Nicholas Boys Smith listed the main reasons for its success as 'the long and genuinely consultative co-design approach with local residents and the local council with consequent much higher levels of confidence, the patient capital nature of the consortium agreement between the landowner and the developers, the popular traditional design, variety and urban form of homes, conventional streets and blocks in walkable streets and the popular focus on sustainability of design, sourcing and green infrastructure.'

In February 2024, Prince William, Duke of Cornwall, in partnership with Cornish charity St Petrocs, announced plans for building 24 homes on Duchy of Cornwall land in Nansledan to provide temporary accommodation for people experiencing homelessness in the area. The homes' development was set to begin in September 2024, with the first homes being completed by autumn 2025.

As a model for reviving Britain’s high streets, the duchy is also developing Market Street with adaptable shop premises, with the first phase set to open in 2027.

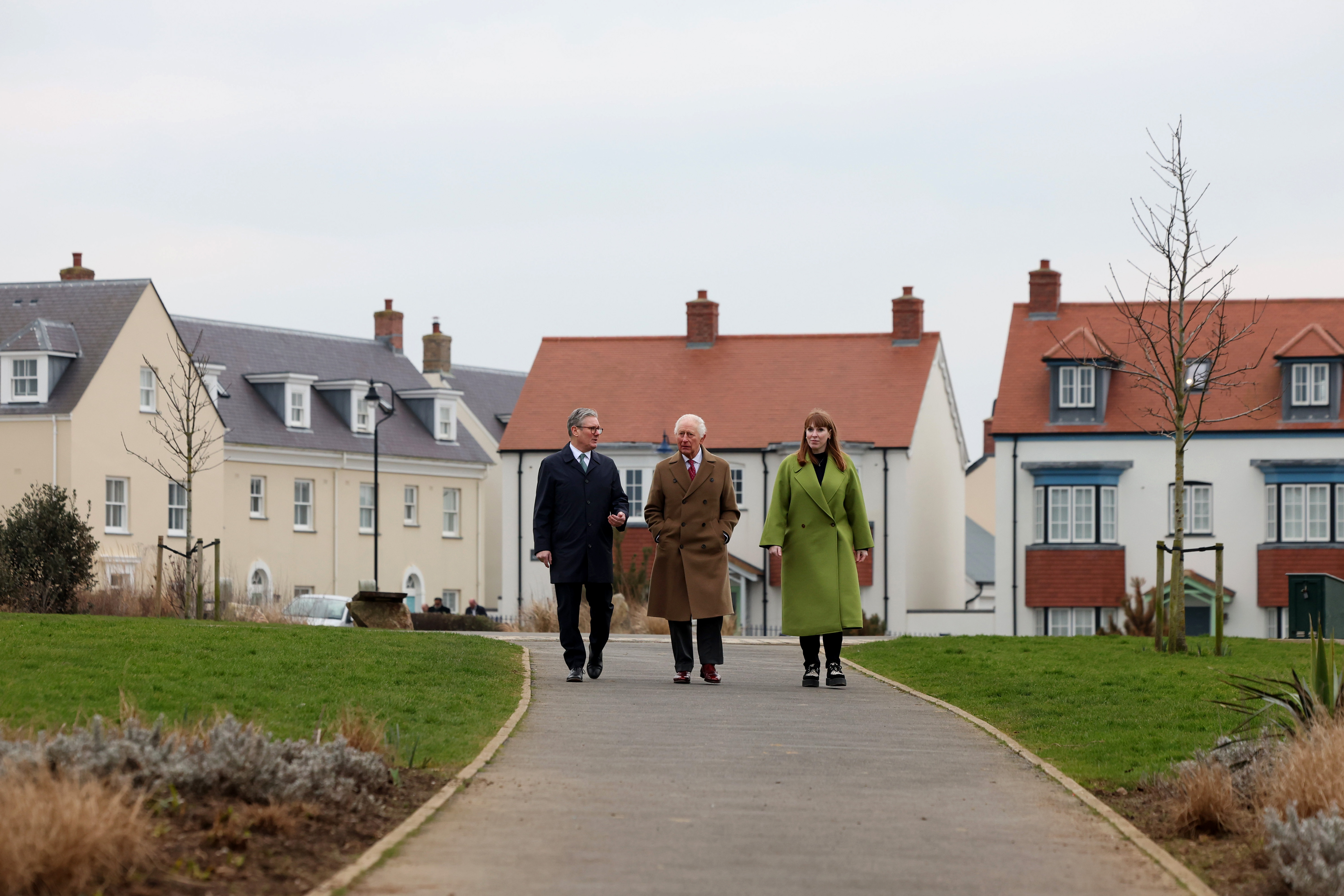
King Charles III (centre) visits the town in 2025, accompanied by Prime Minister Sir Keir Starmer (on the left) and Deputy Prime Minister Angela Rayner (on the right)
