= The Royal Countryside Fund =

Grant making organisation

- Abbreviation: RCF
- Formation: 2010; 16 years ago
- Founder: Charles III
- Type: Non-profit organisation
- Legal status: Charity
- Purpose: To support family farms and rural communities across the UK
- Headquarters: London
- Region served: United Kingdom
- Executive Director: Keith Halstead
- Chair: Heather Hancock
- Website: royalcountrysidefund.org.uk
- Formerly called: The Prince's Countryside Fund

The Royal Countryside Fund (formerly The Prince's Countryside Fund) is a UK-wide charitable organisation founded in 2010 by King Charles III (then the Prince of Wales). It supports family farms and rural communities by providing grants, free business and environmental programmes, and enabling locally-led solutions to the social, economic and environmental challenges facing the British countryside. The Prince's Countryside Fund was rebranded to The Royal Countryside Fund (RCF) in July 2023 with the approval of Charles III.

Since its establishment, The Royal Countryside Fund has awarded more than £12.5 million in grants. Through its programmes, the charity has supported over 5,000 family farms, helping farmers to build resilience and adapt to change, and has backed more than 500 community projects aimed at strengthening rural life and sustaining local services. The RCF published a strategy (2024‍–‍2028) aiming to raise an annual income of £3 million. Their goals include opportunities for young people in rural areas, grants to support community-led projects, helping farms with succession, and environmental and economic resilience. In 2024, the RCF awarded a £20,000 grant to the Herefordshire Rural Hub, part of a broader set of nine farming‑groups in England, Scotland, Northern Ireland receiving funding.
