= Office of the Scottish Charity Regulator =

Charity regulator in Scotland

- Scottish Gaelic: Oifis Riaghladair Carthannais na h-Alba

Non-ministerial government department overview
- Formed: 16 December 2003
- Preceding Non-ministerial government department: Scottish Charities Office
- Jurisdiction: Scotland
- Headquarters: Quadrant House; 9 Riverside Drive; Dundee DD1 4NY
- Employees: 42 (2023/24)
- Annual budget: £3.28 million (2020–21)
- Non-ministerial government department executives: Marieke Dwarshuis, Board Chair; Maureen Mallon, Chief Executive
- Website: www.oscr.org.uk

The Office of the Scottish Charity Regulator (OSCR; Scottish Gaelic: Oifis Riaghladair Carthannais na h-Alba) is a non-ministerial department of the Scottish Government with responsibility for the regulation of charities in Scotland.

OSCR is the independent regulator and registrar for more than 25,000 Scottish charities. OSCR is charged with developing a regulatory framework for Scottish charities, where each charity is clear about its rights and responsibilities. This framework should also foster public confidence in charities. OSCR is directly answerable to the Scottish Parliament. OSCR is based in Dundee.

== Background ==
In 1981 the Law Society of Scotland announced support for a register through which all charities in Scotland could record their purposes, financial details, and accounts. Under section 6 of the Law Reform (Miscellaneous Provisions) (Scotland) Act 1990, the Lord Advocate was given the power to make inquiries either for general or specific purposes and to obtain various types of information from charities. Following the Scotland Act and the establishment of both the Scottish Parliament and the Scottish Government, this power was exercised by the Scottish Ministers.

Initially, charity regulation was carried out by the Scottish Charities Office, a department in the Crown Office, but they were only able to investigate a charity on receipt of a complaint or when they had reasonable grounds to suspect problems. The regulatory function was transferred to OSCR in December 2003.

== History ==
It was formerly an executive agency but following the passing of the Charities and Trustee Investment (Scotland) Act 2005 it was made independent of ministerial control, and answers directly to the Scottish Parliament. It is the equivalent of the Charity Commission for England and Wales and the Charity Commission for Northern Ireland.

In 2005, OSCR published the first definitive list of 18,000 charities operating in Scotland – this information was searchable.

OSCR's full regulatory powers came into force on 24 April 2006.

In July 2008, OSCR published results of a survey showing some positive attitudes towards the organization from the charity sector and the public.

== Functions ==
OSCR performs a range of functions which includes:

- Determining whether bodies are charities
- Keeping a public Register of charities
- Facilitating compliance by charities with the legislation
- Investigating any apparent misconduct in the administration of charities
- Giving information or advice to Scottish Ministers

OSCR also has a role to protect whistleblowers from detrimental treatment. Under the Public Interest Disclosure Act 1998, OSCR is a "prescribed person" and therefore allowed to accept disclosures from people who carry out paid work for a charity.

== Charities Act 2023 ==
The Charities (Regulation and Administration) (Scotland) Bill was passed by the Scottish Parliament on 28 June 2023, and became an Act on 9 August 2023. This Act makes changes to the Charities and Trustee Investment (Scotland) Act 2005. It will:

- give OSCR wider powers to investigate charities and charity trustees
- amend the rules on who can be a charity trustee or a senior office-holder in a charity
- increase the information that OSCR holds about charity trustees
- update the information which needs to be included on the Scottish Charity Register
- create a record of charities that have merged.

The measures in this Act are planned to be introduced on a phased basis, with the first changes taking effect on 1 April 2024. Further changes will be introduced on 1 October 2024, and the final measures will are planned to come into force in summer 2025.
