= Bibliography of Charles III =

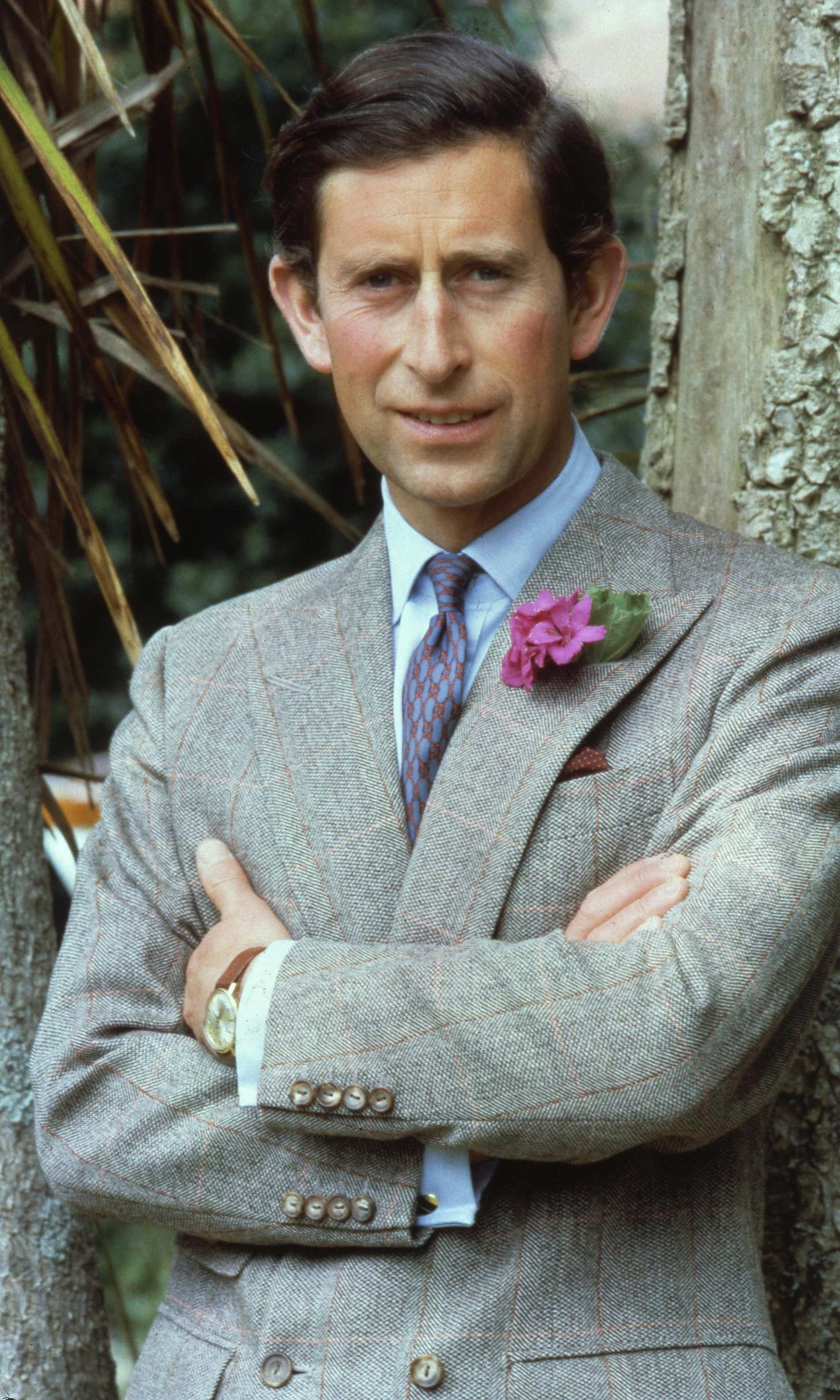
Then-Prince Charles, pictured in 1984, has written many books.

The bibliography of Charles III, King of the United Kingdom and 14 other Commonwealth Realms, is a list of approximately three dozen works which the King has written, co-written, illustrated or narrated, and includes works for which he has written a foreword, introduction or preface.

Any royalties the King receives go to the King Charles III Charitable Fund, as do any profits from Duchy Originals.

== Author ==
- The Old Man of Lochnagar. Illustrated by Sir Hugh Maxwell Casson, K.C.V.O. London: Hamish Hamilton, 1980. Hardcover: ISBN 0-241-10527-7.
- A Vision of Britain: A Personal View of Architecture. Doubleday, 1989. Hardcover: ISBN 978-0-385-26903-2.
- Rain Forest Lecture. Royal Botanic Gardens, 1990. Paperback: ISBN 0-947643-25-7.
- HRH the Prince of Wales Watercolours. Little, Brown and Company, 1991. Hardcover: ISBN 0-8212-1881-6.

== Co-author ==
- Mary Rose. With Armand Hammer. New York: The Sarpedon Press, eds. Photographs: Pat Baker, Christopher Dobbs, Dominic Fontana, Steve Foote. Illustrations: Tayburn London, Arthur Barbose, Nick Evans, Debby Fulford. Portsmouth: The Mary Rose Trust (1985). ASIN B000FBLSNW.
- Architecture & the Environment: HRH The Prince of Wales and the Earth in Balance (Architectural Design Profile). With Andreas C. Papadakis. John Wiley & Sons (1993). Paperback: ISBN 1-85490-143-5.
- Highgrove: An Experiment in Organic Gardening and Farming. With Charles Clover, environment editor for The Daily Telegraph, photography by Andrew Lawson. New York City: Simon & Schuster (1993). Hardcover: ISBN 0-671-79177-X.
- Portrait of an Estate. With Charles Clover. Photography by Andrew Lawson. London: A. G. Carrick. (1993). ISBN 978-0-7538-0018-8.
- Princes As Patrons: The Art Collections of the Princes of Wales from the Renaissance to the Present Day: An Exhibition from the Royal Collection. With Mark Evans, Oliver Millar, National Museum and Gallery, Cardiff. Merrell Holberton (1998). Hardcover: ISBN 1-85894-054-0.
- The Parks and Gardens of Cornwall. With Douglas Ellory Pett. Cornwall: Alison Hodge Publishers (1998). Hardcover: ISBN 0-906720-27-3.
- Respect for the Earth: Sustainable Development. BBC Radio 4 Reith Lectures (2000). With Christopher Patten, et al. London: Profile Books (2000). Paperback: ISBN 978-1-86197-254-5.
- The Garden at Highgrove. With Candida Lycett Green. Photography by Andrew Lawson and Christopher Simon Sykes. London: Cassell & Co. (2001). ISBN 978-1-84188-142-3.
- Watercolours and Drawings from the Collection of Queen Elizabeth the Queen Mother. With Susan Owens. Royal Collection Enterprises (2005). ISBN 978-1-902163-78-9.
- The Elements of Organic Gardening at Highgrove, Clarence House & Birkhall. With Stephanie Donaldson. Kales Press (2007). ISBN 978-0-9670-0769-4.
- Harmony: A New Way of Looking at Our World. With Tony Juniper and Ian Skelly. Blue Door. (2010). Hardback: ISBN 978-0-007348-03-9.
- Highgrove: A Garden Celebrated. With Bunny Guinness. London: Weidenfeld & Nicolson. (2013). Hardcover ISBN 978-0-29786-935-1
- Highgrove: An English Country Garden. With Bunny Guinness. London: Rizzoli International Publications. (2015). Hardcover ISBN 978-0-84784-561-3
- HRH The Prince of Wales; Juniper, Tony; Shuckburgh, Emily (26 January 2017). Climate Change. illus. Ruth Palmer. London: Ladybird Books. ISBN 978-0-7181-8585-5.

== Illustrator ==
- Travels with the Prince: Paintings and Drawings Selected by H.R.H. the Prince of Wales. Imogen Lock, ed. Framlingham: Sheeran Lock (1998). Paperback: ISBN 1-900123-20-7, ISBN 978-1-900123-20-4.

== Narrator ==
- The Prince's Choice: A Personal Selection from Shakespeare: Performed by Richard Briers & Cast. William Shakespeare. Performed by Richard Briers, John Gielgud, Glenda Jackson, Alan Bates, Robert Lindsay, Maggie Smith, Juliet Stevenson, et al. Narrated by Charles, Prince of Wales. Selections divided into categories (e.g. extraordinary people, public life, humour). London: Hodder & Stoughton Audio Books (1995). Audio Cassette / Audiobook: ISBN 1-85998-514-9, ISBN 978-1-85998-514-4.

== Foreword ==
- More Goon Show Scripts, Spike Milligan. Sphere Books (1974) ISBN 0722160755
- New Land For Old: Environmental Renaissance of the Lower Swansea Valley . Stephen J Lavender. (1981) ISBN 0852744536
- To the Ends of the Earth. Sir Ranulph Fiennes. (1983) ISBN 0877954909
- Airborne Free: Red Devils & Other Rare Breeds. Mark Bryant, ed. London: Leo Cooper, Octopus Books (1990). ISBN 978-0-85052-153-5. Description: observations on airborne forces and wildlife management by more than fifty cartoonists: George Worsley Adamson, Barry Fantoni, Alex Graham, Martin Honeysett, Peter Maddocks, Gerald Scarfe, Bill Tidy, Kevin Woodcock et al. Royalties to the Airborne Forces Charities Development Trust and the David Shepherd Conservation Foundation.
- Village Buildings of Britain. Matthew Rice. Little, Brown (1991). ISBN 978-0-316-88866-0.
- A Countrywoman's Notes. Rosemary Verey. London: Frances Lincoln (1993). Miniature edition, ISBN 978-0-7112-0888-9.
- Charity Appeals: The Complete Guide to Success. Marion Allford Dent. JM Dent & Institute of Fundraising Managers (1993). ISBN 978-0-460-86191-5.
- The Builder Illustrations Index 1843–1883. Ruth Richardson and Robert Thorne. Builder Group plc & Hutton + Rostron (1994). ISBN 978-0-907101-06-2.
- Giles 50th Annual, Carl Giles. Pedigree Books (1996) ISBN 1-874507-65-1
- Shakespeare's Window Into the Soul. Martin Lings. Publisher Inner Traditions (1996). Paperback: ISBN 978-1594771200.
- World Reshaped – Fifty Years After the War in Europe: Volume 1, Royal United Services Institute for Defence and Security Studies (RUSI). Richard Cobbold, ed. Palgrave Macmillan (1996). ISBN 978-0-333-65453-8.
- Polo. Susan Barrantes, author and photographer. Introduction by Juan Carlos Harriot. Buenos Aires: Ediciones Lariviere, Rizzoli International (1997). Hardcover: ISBN 987-95280-8-5.
- Historical Atlas of South-West England. Roger Kain and William Ravenhill, eds. Illustrated by Helen Jones. Exeter: University of Exeter Press (1999). ISBN 978-0-85989-434-0.
- Hospice Without Walls. Andrew Bibby. Photographs by Ski Harrison. Preface by Margaret Forster. Calouste Gulbenkian Foundation (1999). Paperback: ISBN 0-903319-86-1.
- A Prayer for All Seasons: The Collects of the Book of Common Prayer. Introduction by Ian Curteis. Cambridge: Lutterworth Press (1999). ISBN 978-0-7188-2994-0.
- Your Passport to Safer Travel (World Wise). Mark Hodson. Thomas Cook (2000). Paperback: ISBN 1-900341-14-X.
- The Bushmen of Southern Africa: Slaughter of the Innocent. Sandy Gall. Pimlico (2002). ISBN 978-0-7126-6436-3.
- The Cancer Prevention Book: Holistic Guidelines From the World-Famous Bristol Cancer Help Centre. Rosy Daniel and Rachel Ellis. Hunter House Publishers (2002). Hardcover: ISBN 0-89793-361-3.
- The Apothecaries' Garden. Sue Minter. Stroud: Sutton Publishing (2003). ISBN 978-0-7509-3638-5.
- La Mortella: An Italian Garden Paradise. Susana Walton. Photographs by John Ferro Sims. New Holland Publishers (2003). ISBN 978-1-85974-916-6.
- An Entertaining Life. Harry Secombe. London: Robson Books Ltd (2004). ISBN 978-1-86105-811-9.
- Fauna Britannica. Stefan T. Buczacki. Hamlyn (2005). ISBN 978-0-600-61392-3.
- Royal Goldsmiths: The Art of Rundell & Bridge, 1797–1843. Christopher Hartop et al. Cambridge: John Adamson for Koopman Rare Art (2005). Paperback: ISBN 978-0-9524322-3-4. The net proceeds of the sale of this book benefit the Prince's Trust.
- History and Landscape: The Guide to National Trust Properties in England, Wales and Northern Ireland. Lydia Greeves. National Trust Books (2006). Hardcover: ISBN 978-1-905400-13-3.
- Shakespeare's Sonnets and the Bible: A Spiritual Interpretation With Christian Sources. Ira B. Zinman. Publisher, World Wisdom (2009). ISBN 978-1-933316-74-1
- The Practice of Classical Architecture: The Architecture of Quinlan and Francis Terry, 2005–2015. David Watkin. New York: Rizzoli (2015). Hardcover: ISBN 978-0-8478-4490-6.
- Man of the Trees: Richard St. Barbe Baker, the First Global Conservationist. Paul Hanley. University of Regina Press (2018). Paperback: ISBN 978-0-8897-7566-4
- Encounters on the Holy Mountain: Stories from Mount Athos. Peter Howorth, Christopher Thomas. Turnhout: Brepols Publishers (2020). ISBN 978-2-503-58911-4
- Lily's Promise: How I Survived Auschwitz and Found the Strength to Live. Lily Ebert, Dov Forman. Macmillan (2021). ISBN 978-1-529-07340-9
- It's Up to Us: A Children's Terra Carta for Nature, People and Planet. Christopher Lloyd. What on Earth Publishing Ltd (2021). ISBN 978-1-913-75055-8
- The Platinum Jubilee Cookbook. Ameer Kotecha. Jon Croft Editions (2022). ISBN 978-0-993-35406-9

== Introduction ==
- Living Free. H.A. Williams. London: Continuum International Publishing Group Ltd. (2006). Paperback: ISBN 0-8264-9469-2, ISBN 978-0-8264-9469-6.

== Preface ==
- Highgrove Florilegium: Watercolours depicting plants grown in the garden at Highgrove. Addision Publications (2008). OCLC 463290110.
- Wells Cathedral West Front: Construction, Sculpture and Conservation. Jerry Sampson. Foreword by Peter E. Lasko. Stroud: Sutton Publishing (1998). ISBN 0-7509-1450-5, ISBN 978-0-7509-1450-5. ASIN 0750914505.
- Sealed by Time: The Loss and Recovery of the Mary Rose. Vol. I: The Archaeology of the Mary Rose. Peter Marsden, et al. Mary Rose Trust Ltd (2003). First of five volumes. Hardcover: ISBN 0-9544029-0-1, ISBN 978-0-9544029-0-7.

== Television documentaries written ==
- Harmony: A New Way of Looking at Our World, NBC 2010.
- The Prince and the Composer: A Film about Hubert Parry by HRH The Prince of Wales Dir. John Bridcut, BBC Four 2011.

== Guest-editor ==
- "HRH The Prince of Wales: Guest Editor". Country Life. 13 November 2013.
- "HRH The Prince of Wales: Guest Editor". Country Life. 14 November 2018.
- "HRH The Prince of Wales". The Voice. 1 September 2022.

== Articles written ==
- HRH The Prince of Wales (3 October 2000). "Bowel Cancer: A Cancer No one Wants to Talk About". Daily Mail. Archived from the original on 8 August 2020.
- HRH The Prince of Wales (2 September 2016). "Why we should buy wool this winter". The Telegraph.
- HRH The Prince of Wales (6 October 2018). "Prince Charles celebrates the Royal Ballet's Principal dancer Edward Watson". The Telegraph.
- HRH The Prince of Wales (10 November 2018). "How Britain's rich craft heritage is the key to our future". The Telegraph.
- HRH The Prince of Wales (18 April 2019). "At Easter, it is inspiring to see how people can find light even in the midst of terrible darkness". The Telegraph.
- HRH The Prince of Wales (17 November 2019). "HRH The Prince of Wales: 'We urgently need a fresh, positive and practical vision for the countryside'". Country Life.
- HRH The Prince of Wales (22 April 2020). "The Prince of Wales: 'After the suffering and the selflessness we are witnessing, we cannot allow ourselves to go back to how we were. This is a moment in history.'". Country Life.
- HRH The Prince of Wales (26 September 2020). "With the Prince's Trust, we know we can make a crucial difference in these uncertain times". The Telegraph.
- HRH The Prince of Wales (1 January 2021). "Last year, the compassion of the British people outshone every darkness". The Telegraph.
- HRH The Prince of Wales (March 2021). "A message from HRH The Prince of Wales, honorary fellow of the Royal College of Physicians". Future Healthcare Journal. 8 (1): 5–8. doi:10.7861/fhj.8.1.hrh. PMC 8004332. PMID 33791451. Archived from the original on 13 October 2023.
- HRH The Prince of Wales (27 August 2021). "We must keep memories of the Holocaust alive". The Telegraph.
- HRH Prince Charles (15 September 2021). "Prince Charles teams up with Jamie Oliver and Jimmy Doherty in war on food waste". Daily Mirror.
- HRH The Prince of Wales (31 October 2021). "The private sector holds the key to saving the planet". The Telegraph.
- HRH The Prince of Wales (4 January 2022). "Exclusive: Prince Charles Says 'Our Children Are Judging Us' On Climate Change". Newsweek.
- HM King Charles III (14 November 2023). "My birthday wish for our people and planet". The Big Issue.
