= Birds International =

Company working in the field of aviculture

- Date opened: 1973
- Location: Quezon City, Philippines
- Land area: 6 hectares
- No. of animals: 6,000
- No. of species: 198
- Memberships: CITES; Fundacao Biodiversitas; Brazilian Institute of Environment and Renewable Natural Resources; International Union for Conservation of Nature; TRAFFIC Sudamerica
- Website: https://birdsinternational.net/

Birds International Incorporated or BII (not to be confused with BirdLife International, an environmental non-governmental organization and not affiliated with the short-lived quarterly publication Birds International by Joe Forshaw) is a company working in the field of aviculture established in 1975 by Antonio de Dios. It is located in Quezon City near Manila, the capital of the Philippines.

Birds International functions as a research and breeding center especially for endangered species of exotic birds. The company thus uses the sub-title "Avicultural Park & Research Centre". It is the largest captive bird breeding facility in the world; it is also regarded by many to be the best. The company especially specializes in, and is most notable for parrot production and therefore is also referred to as a parrot breeding facility. It is reputed to have the largest parrot collection in the world.

According to the website Zoos of the World, Birds International has a total area of six hectares hosting 6,000 animals from 198 species only one being a mammal and the rest birds. The number of staff is 167. The facilities are not open to the public. The location of Birds International is suitable since the tropical climate of Philippines is conducive to the breeding and propagation of exotic birds.

== Commercial operations ==
Birds International provides captive-bred birds to pet lovers, hobbyist, zoos and parks.

The company is evaluated to be "the biggest and most successful breeder of exotic birds in the world". It has 20,000 exotic birds at any given time. Most of them are exported to Asia, Europe and Japan. Prices can be high, making Birds International a successful business venture and thus a model for similar enterprises.

It has also been pointed out as a model for aviculture industry in Australia where, as in the Philippines, commercial trade in native exotic birds has existed for decades. In the Senate report titled Commercial Utilisation of Australian Native Wildlife, an entire paragraph is set apart for Birds International experience based on a submission: "As an example of the potential for expansion, Ms Anderson noted that an avicultural enterprise in Manila, 'Birds International' which houses six thousand birds on a 6-acre (2.4 ha) property, breeds to order large quantities of birds for overseas markets. They retain 15 per cent of stock bred each year for future breeding. Ms Anderson believes that 'similar establishments could be developed in Australia to house specifically Australian species of birds and the benefit to the Australian economy in terms of trade would be substantial'. Flow-on effects could include a boost to domestic markets for birds and a rejuvenated interest in breeding birds in captivity which could assist the recovery of rare species in the wild." Indeed, G. R. Wilson mentions "some international competitors such as Birds International" as a source of "considerable competition when they target markets with low animal-health standards" in his entry on trade in native birds in The New Rural Industries handbook of the Australian Rural Industries Research and Development Corporation.

The company carries out activities other than breeding and sales of birds. These include veterinary and quarantine services and aviary and cage construction. The veterinary clinic received attention in 2002 for carrying out surgery on a 2.5-foot (0.76 m)-tall Philippine eagle (Pithecophaga jefferyi), a rare, almost extinct animal, rescued by the authorities after being wounded by a bullet and named "Amianan". The animal eventually died of a fungal infection and was stuffed.

== Birds bred ==
The birds bred by Birds International are usually from the species that are threatened in the wild, due to illegal poaching and forest destruction. Initially it bred parrots only, but the production line today includes other birds such as Asian doves, hornbills, gallinaceous birds, cranes, and flamingos.

The species are marked either by open/closed leg-band or by microchip implant. Microchips are used for specimens with body weights over 80 grams (2.8 oz).

=== Spix's macaw ===
Even though the company is breeding many endangered species "it has had exceptional success with the production of the Spix's macaw" (Cyanopsitta spixii, also known as the little blue macaw), a species that has become extinct in the wild in 2000 after the last known male disappeared according to Instituto Brasileiro do Meio Ambiente e dos Recursos Naturais Renováveis (IBAMA, Brazilian Institute of Environment and Renewable Natural Resources in English).

Birds International participated in the Permanent Committee for the Recovery of the Spix's Macaw, called CPRAA, established by IBAMA in 1990 and its Ararinha Azul Project (Little Blue Macaw Project). Other participants included BirdLife International, WWF-Brazil and the American Federation of Aviculture and most of the funding came from IBAMA and the Fundación Loro Parque (Loro Parque Foundation ) of Spain. Birds International became a party to CPRAA only when the government of Fernando Collor de Mello granted an amnesty to all private owners of the Spix's macaw to boost the conservation efforts.

Several exchanges of birds were made between institutions and individuals for increasing the probability of breeding based on DNA analysis as part of the program. Birds International's efforts turned out to be the most successful: "Dr. Hammerli was the first aviculturist to produce young Spix's macaws in 1984, however, Antonio de Dios has had the most successful breeding results at Birds International. This collection has achieved a second generation breeding, a real breakthrough for the future survival of this species." Birds International also facilitated the transfer of birds from São Paulo Zoo to Loro Parque for breeding by donating two young males to the former as the transfer that would leave the Zoo with a single crippled male was politically unpopular. It also gave another captive-bred female to the Chaparral facility in Recife, Brazil, to replace the mate of their male that was left to the wilderness with the hope that it would mate with the last known male. However Natasha Schischakin, who is critical of Antonio de Dios, states that "The owner of BII, Antonio de Dios offered to donate these birds to the reintroduction effort, but only with the establishment of rigorous protocols and involvement of his staff in the reintroduction program."

In 2001 two pairs of Spix's macaws were transferred from Birds International to Al Wabra Wildlife Preservation (AWWP) in Qatar. In 2003 and 2004 the entire remaining 25-strong population of the birds in Birds International was transferred to AWWP making its collection the largest population of the species in the world. Low yield of breeding since 1999 and the threat posed by avian influenza in its environment were behind the decision of Birds International to transfer the ownership of the birds. The transfer of birds to AWWP has been a source of controversy leading to the dissolution of CPRAA. Tony Juniper who has been involved in the efforts to save the Spix's macaw has harshly criticized the private holders of the birds including Birds International; because he believes that reintroduction of the Spix's to its natural habitat is more important than captive breeding.

=== Other species ===
According to Roger Bringas and Sheldon Dingle from the American Federation of Aviculture who visited the facility, "some of BII's other notable successes have been breeding and hand rearing the Pesquet's parrot, the black palm cockatoo, the guaiabero parrot and Victoria crowned pigeons to name but a few".

Marc Boussekey of Espace Zoologique, France, has observed that the red-vented cockatoo population of the company is "healthy and really well maintained" (Boussekey also covers Birds International among other parrot breeding facilities in a scientific article). Antonio de Dios has made a publication about their protocol for the species.

== Affiliations ==
=== Relations with CITES ===
Birds International is registered under Convention on International Trade in Endangered Species of Wild Fauna and Flora, better known with its abbreviation CITES. It is one of the 164 operations in the world and two operations in the Philippines placed in "Register of operations that breed Appendix-I animal species for commercial purposes", shortly referred to as "Register of captive-breeding operations." Birds International's registration covers the species Cacatua haematuropygia and Guarouba guarouba making it the only CITES registered operation for both of them.

Birds International also follows the meetings of CITES. It has participated to the Fourteenth meeting of the Conference of the Parties held in The Hague, Netherlands in 2007 and the Twenty-third meeting of the Animals Committee held in Geneva, Switzerland, as an observer.

The company presented eight proposals for the registration of some of its bird breeding operations to the CITES Secretariat in 2006 and 2007. The proposals were discussed at various CITES meetings. During the Fourteenth meeting of the Conference of the Parties all of its requests for registration were rejected based on the grounds that the birds in question were not native to Philippines and the company could not verify the legality of its acquirement of their breeding stocks. However the vote was a close one, members of the European Union supporting registration and some countries that are the homelands of birds in question objecting. Had the request been approved Birds International would have been able to commercially trade the following birds: Goffin's cockatoo of Indonesia, yellow crowned amazon parrot of Central and South America, yellow headed amazon parrot of Central America, red crowned amazon parrot of Mexico, hyacinth macaw of Brazil, blue-throated macaw and red fronted macaw of Bolivia and the military macaw of Central and South America.

=== Others ===
The organisation also co-operates with Fundacao Biodiversitas and Instituto Brasileiro to Meio Ambiente e dos Recursos Naturais Renovaveis from Brazil, International Union for Conservation of Nature (also known as World Conservation Union), its Species Survival Commission and TRAFFIC Sudamerica.

Its local affiliations include Manila Zoo, National Museum of the Philippines, Biodiversity Management Bureau (formerly Protected Areas and Wildlife Bureau) and Philippine Council for Agricultural Forestry and Natural Resources Research and Development.

== See also ==
- Katala Foundation
- SOS/BirdLife Slovakia
