= Rasa Island =

Island in the Philippines in the province of Palawan

- Location within Palawan

Geography
- Location: 0.5 kilometers (0.31 mi) off Narra, Palawan
- Coordinates: 9°13′25″N 118°26′35″E
- Adjacent to: Sulu Sea

Administration
- Philippines
- Region: Mimaropa
- Province: Palawan
- Municipality: Narra
- Barangay: Panacan

Rasa Island is a flat coral island in the Sulu Sea just off the coast of the municipality of Narra in Palawan, Philippines. It is a shallow island surrounded by mangroves and tidal flats containing one of the country's last remaining coastal forests. The island is home to the largest population of the endemic and critically endangered Philippine cockatoo in the wild in the Philippines. It was declared a protected area in 2006.

== Geography ==
Rasa Island is a large irregular mangrove swamp on a coral reef that extends about 640 metres (2,100 ft) beyond the island at its southwest and northeast ends. It is located about 0.5 kilometers (0.31 mi) from Casuarina Point and forms the northeastern side of Mantaquin Bay. Only one-third of the island is permanently dry with the remaining two-thirds exposed to the occasional tides. To its north lie Arena Island and other small coralline islands on the coast of Aborlan. To the south across the Mantaquin Bay are Linda and Emelina islands.

Rasa Island is administered as part of the Narra barangay of Panacan. It is just 3 kilometres (1.9 mi) north of the Narra poblacion and approximately 90 kilometres (56 mi) south of Palawan's provincial capital, Puerto Princesa.

== Biodiversity ==
Rasa Island is a natural habitat of the globally threatened Philippine cockatoo, known locally as katala and also known as the red-vented cockatoo, a parrot species endemic to the Philippines. In order to protect this bird species whose number dropped sharply from as many as 4,000 in 1994 to only about 1,000 in 2001 due to illegal poaching and rapid deforestation of its coastal environment, the Philippine government declared the whole island and surrounding waters a bird sanctuary known as Rasa Island Wildlife Sanctuary. The 1,983-hectare (4,900-acre) bird sanctuary is now administered by the Department of Environment and Natural Resources in partnership with the Philippine Cockatoo Conservation Program of the Katala Foundation. Former poachers from the Tagbanua community of Narra now serve as the island's deputized wildlife wardens.

A number of other endemic birds have also been observed in the island such as the blue-headed racket-tail, grey imperial pigeon, Chinese egret and Mantanani scops owl. Its waters also host a significant population of green sea turtles, hawksbill sea turtles and dugongs. Apart from mangroves, Ipil trees also grow on the island.

== See also ==
- List of islands of the Philippines
