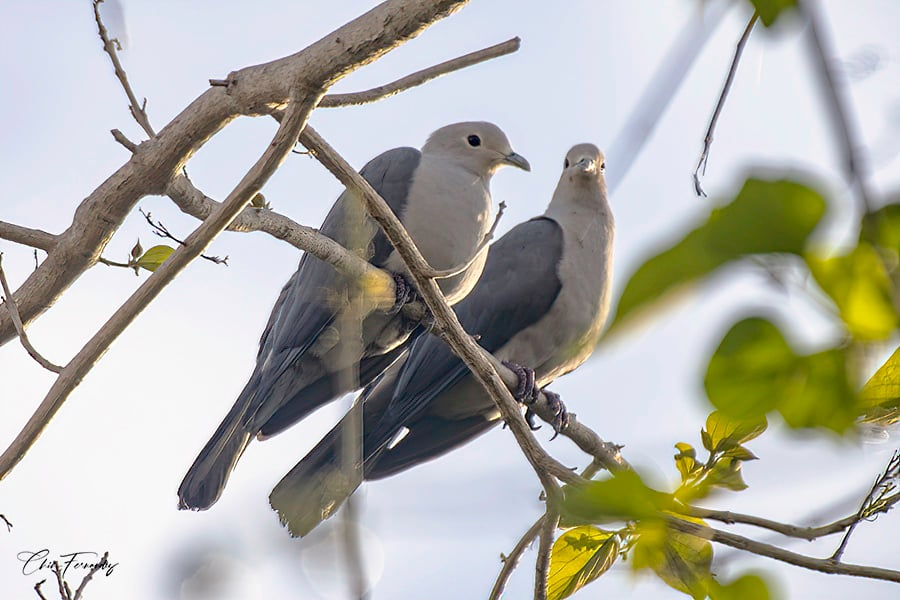
- ssp. pickeringii

Conservation status
- Near Threatened (IUCN 3.1)

Scientific classification
- Kingdom: Animalia
- Phylum: Chordata
- Class: Aves
- Order: Columbiformes
- Family: Columbidae
- Genus: Ducula
- Species: D. pickeringii

Binomial name
- Ducula pickeringii (Cassin, 1855)

= Grey imperial pigeon =

Species of bird

The grey imperial pigeon (Ducula pickeringii) is a species of bird in the family Columbidae. It is found in the Sulu Archipelago, Miangas and Talaud Islands. It is a small island specialist where its natural habitats are tropical moist lowland forests and plantations. It is threatened by habitat loss.

== Description and taxonomy ==
=== Subspecies ===
Three subspecies are recognized:

- D. p. pickeringii – Found on islets off of North and Northeast Borneo and the islets in the Sulu Sea from Balabac, Cagayancillo and Sulu Island.
- D. p. langhornei – Found on West Bolod, East Bolod and Loran; paler with a more defined white ring around eye.
- D. p. palmasensis – Found on Miangas and Talaud Islands; paler and less pink on underparts

== Behaviour and ecology ==
It has been noted feeding on fruits of figs and Cananga trees. Usually seen singly or in pairs. It sometimes associates with Green imperial pigeon and Pied imperial pigeon. Not much is known about its breeding habits but a female with a developing egg inside was taken in January in Miangas. Juveniles collected in July in Sabah.

== Habitat and conservation status ==
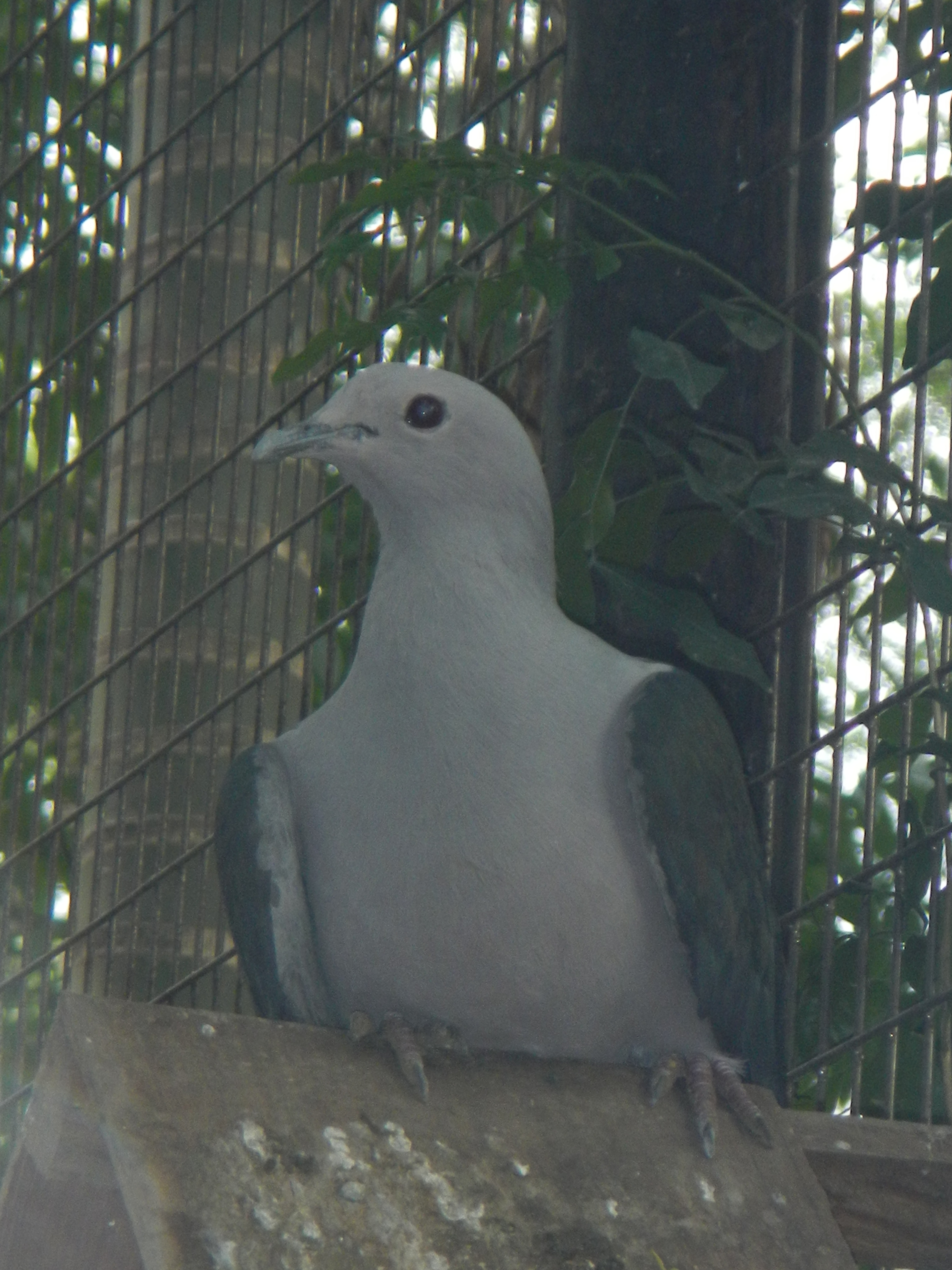
A captive Grey Imperial Pigeon seen in Ninoy Aquino Parks and WIldlife Center

Its natural habitats at tropical moist lowland and primary and secondary forest and cultivated areas with trees. Little is known about its movements. It is reportedly resident on some northern Bornean islands, but certainly moves between Philippine islands, and varied in abundance from 1995 to 1997 on Karakelang, Indonesia. Like other small-island specialists, it presumably wanders in search of food.

The IUCN Red List has assessed this bird as Near Threatened with the population estimated at 7,500 to 26,500 mature individuals as of 2025. Its main threat is habitat destruction through both legal and Illegal logging, conversion into farmland and urban development for tourism. Its large size makes it a target of hunters both for food and as a pet.

It occurs in a few protected areas like the Turtle Islands National Park, Tunku Abdul Rahman National Park, Maratuas and Pulau Mantanani Bird Sanctuary and Rasa Island where it benefits from the protection of the Philippine cockatoo.

Conservation actions proposed are survey in suitable habitat in order to calculate density estimates, better understand movements and ecology and calculate remaining habitat to refine the population estimate. Propose sites/islands supporting key populations for establishment as strict protected areas. Eradicate macaques and black rats from protected islands. Devise and initiate conservation awareness campaigns to control hunting and curb deforestation on key islands. Seek ban on trade in Imperial pigeons. Review taxonomic status of two subspecies (pickeringii and langhornei).
