= Andrew Lawson (photographer) =

British photographer, artist and author

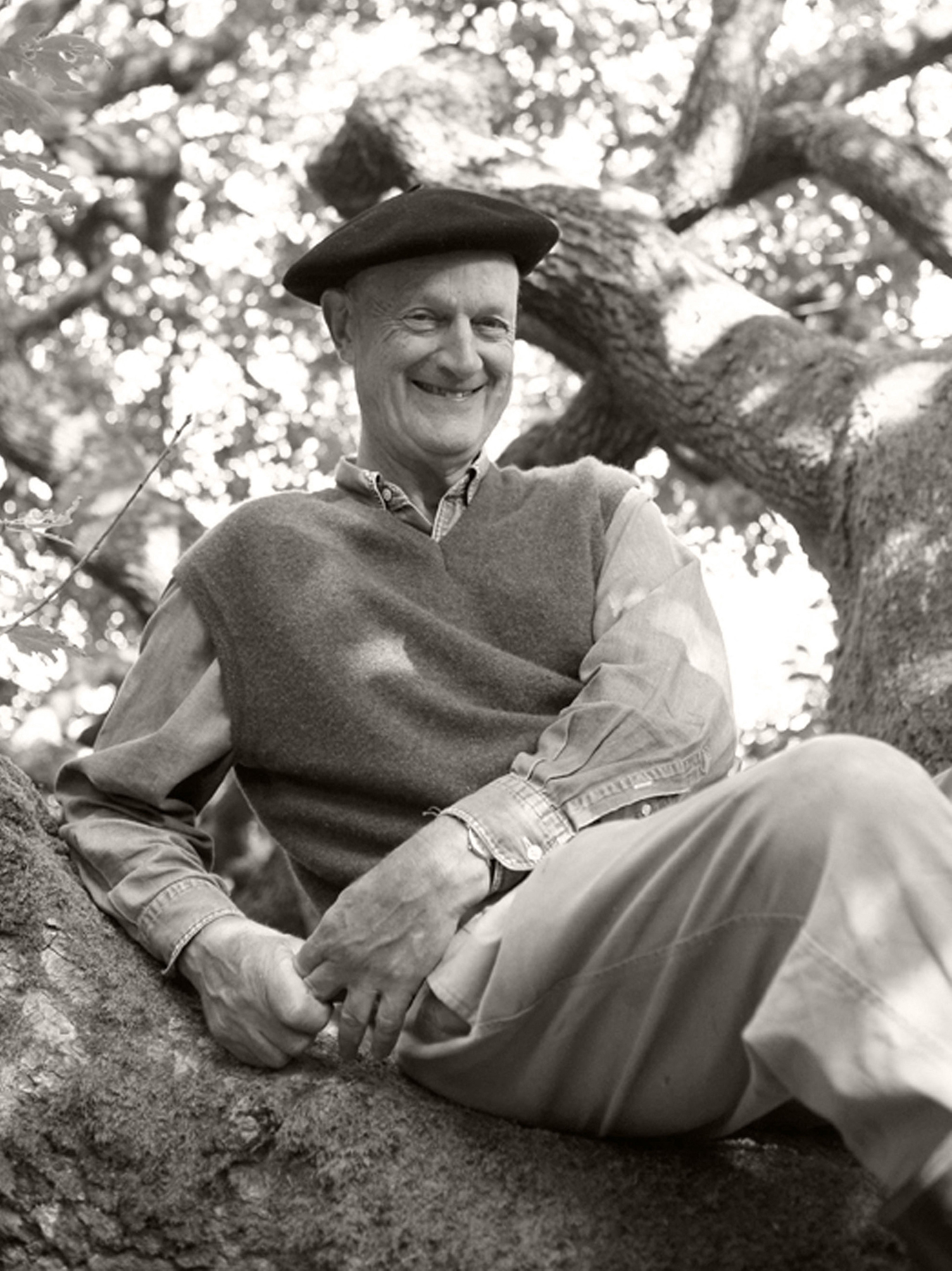
Andrew Lawson in 2011

Andrew Lawson (born 19 March 1945) is a British photographer, artist and author.

== Early life and education ==
The fifth of six children of Sir William Lawson CBE BA FCA, he was educated at Lancing College in Sussex (Captain of the School 1963). At Pembroke College, Oxford, he read medicine and was editor of The Isis magazine, Chairman of the Art Society, and President of the College Junior Common Room.

After his BA degree he abandoned his medical studies in November 1966. Florence had been flooded, and Lawson took the first available train to the city to help with the salvage of damaged art and waterlogged books. Subsequently, from 1968 to 1972, he studied Fine Art at St Martin's School of Art in London. As a painter, he has exhibited at The Royal Academy, The New Grafton Gallery and The Gallery in Cork Street. Lawson's photographic career followed his time working as a publishing Art Director, commissioning photographs to illustrate books and increasingly contributing his own pictures.

== Career ==
He gained recognition in the late 1980s as one of the UK's leading garden photographer promoting British gardens to the public through books and magazine contributions. Since taking up photography in his late 30s he has written and contributed to over 70 books and received numerous awards including a Lifetime Achievement Award by Garden Media Guild.

Publications by Andrew Lawson include The Gardener's Book of Colour, published by Frances Lincoln. His photographs accompany books by Rosemary Verey, Charles, Prince of Wales, Penelope Hobhouse, Sir Roy Strong, Tom Stuart-Smith, Arabella Lennox-Boyd, David Austin, Ursula Buchan, Stephen Lacey and Mary Keen, amongst others. Andrew is donating his archive to the Garden Museum.

Lawson's botanical expertise and knowledge of the history of British gardens has underpinned his career. His own two gardens have been featured in numerous publications. Lawson was perhaps the first photographer to explore the frost in the early morning and un-trodden snow in an otherwise lifeless, winter garden. Projects include books on terracotta pots in the garden (Jim Keeling); the use of art and poetry in the garden (Ian Hamilton Finley) and the development of organic gardening (HRH The Prince of Wales)

Together with Jerry Harpur, Lawson founded the Professional Garden Photographers Association in 1999. The PGPA was founded following an exhibition Lawson curated at the RHS Vincent Square in 1999. This show has since developed into an annual event and evolved into the International Garden Photographer of the Year, on which Lawson was a founder member of the Board, and a judge for many years.

Andrew Lawson's first solo book as author and photographer was Discover Unexpected London published in 1977, which originated from his roving around London making photographs of street oddities and arcane traditions. This was followed by a book on London craftsmen, and another on English shopfronts.

== Personal life ==
In 1970 he married Briony, daughter of the writer, Ronald Duncan, and they have two daughters. They have retained West Mill, the Duncan family home in an isolated valley at Welcombe in North Devon, which they manage as a nature reserve. Here there is a particular emphasis on butterflies, which had been a childhood obsession.

== Honours and awards ==
- 2013 – John Brookes Lifetime Achievement Award, Society of Garden Designers.
- 2010 – Lifetime Achievement Award, Garden Media Guild
- 2007 – Garden Photographer of the Year Garden Media Guild
- 2007 – Photographer of the Year – Garden Writers’ Guild award for a portfolio of garden and/or plant photographs published in diverse media.
- 2002 – Winner of Photographer's Choice Award, Garden Media Awards
- 1994 – Royal Horticultural Society Gold Medal
- 1999 – Garden Photographer of the Year
- 1997 – Garden Photograph of the Year

== Books ==
- Lawson, Andrew and Buchan, Ursula. (2017) The English Garden. London: Frances Lincoln. ISBN 9780711239166
- Lawson, Andrew (2015). The Gardener's Book Of Colour (Revised edition). Pimpernel Press. ISBN 9781910258026.
- Lawson, Andrew and Richardson, Tim. (2015) Oxford College Gardens. London: Frances Lincoln. ISBN 9780711232181
- Lawson, Andrew and Compton, Tania. (2007) Dream Gardens. London: Merrell. ISBN 9781858943688
- Lawson, Andrew and Buchan, Ursula. (2006) The English Garden.London: Frances Lincoln. ISBN 9780711226388
- Lawson, Andrew (1999). Plants for all seasons: 250 plants for year-round success in your garden. London: Frances Lincoln. ISBN 9780711213920.
- Lawson, Andrew (1998). Great English Gardens. Weidenfeld & Nicolson. ISBN 9780753804988.
- Lawson, Andrew (1996). The Gardener's Book of Color. Reader's Digest Association. ISBN 9780895778581.
- Lawson, Andrew (1993). Performance Plants. Viking. ISBN 9780670847082.
- Lawson, Andrew (1978). Handmade in London. Cassell. ISBN 9780304297436.
- Lawson, Andrew (1977). Discover Unexpected London by Andrew Lawson. Elsevier-Phaidon.
- Lawson, Andrew and Evans, Bill (1981). A Nation of Shopkeepers. London:Plexus. ISBN 0859650316
