= Murder of Benjie Ganay =

2004 murder in the Palawan, Philippines

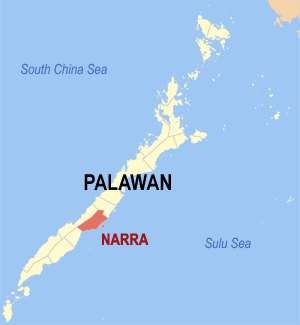
- Location of Narra on the island of Palawan, where the murder took place
- Location: Narra, Palawan, Philippines
- Date: July 17, 2004
- Attack type: Murder, abduction, cannibalism, body desecration
- Victim: Benjie Ganay (aged 25)
- Perpetrators: Eladio Baule; Gerald Baule; Sabtuari Pique; Junnie Buyot (Note: Buyot later confessed to police and became a prosecution witness.)
- Motive: Alleged retaliation following a dispute during a wedding reception

On 17 July 2004, 25-year-old Filipino Benjie Ganay was murdered in Narra, Palawan, Philippines, after attending the wedding reception of a relative. According to police, Ganay was abducted following a dispute during the celebration and taken to a secluded area, where he was stabbed to death. His body was later burned using coconut leaves and kerosene.

Police alleged that the four suspects consumed parts of Ganay's remains after the killing, and investigators examined claims that some of the roasted flesh had been served to guests who were still attending the wedding reception. The case came to light after one of the suspects confessed to the crime several days later, leading to the recovery of Ganay's remains and the arrest of the other suspects. It received widespread attention in the Philippines and internationally because of the allegations of cannibalism.

== Background ==
A wedding reception was held in the remote village of Narra, Palawan for the marriage of the daughter of 47-year-old father Eladio Baule who is a farm worker. Among the guests was Benjie Ganay, a 25-year-old relative of the Baule family. According to police reports, a dispute began during the celebration after Ganay accidentally touched the bride's buttocks while guests were drinking and dancing. Some reports stated that Ganay had tripped before making contact, while others described the incident as an "accidental touch". The incident allegedly angered Eladio Baule, who confronted Ganay after the reception.

Police said that Baule later gathered his son Gerald Baule, his nephew Sabtuari Pique, and his cousin Junnie Buyot before they confronted Ganay and took him away from the wedding area. They allegedly transported him to a secluded location outside the village, where the killing took place.

== Murder ==
After taking Ganay away from the wedding reception, Eladio, Gerald, Pique, and Buyot brought him to a secluded area where he was stabbed to death. The suspects allegedly burned Ganay's body using coconut leaves and kerosene. Buyot later told police that the group consumed parts of Ganay's body after it was burned. According to his statement, Baule forced him to eat a piece of the flesh, which he initially vomited several times before allegedly being forced to swallow it at knifepoint.

Police chief Perla Bacuel said the suspects may have been influenced by their drunkenness and that the smell of the burning body may have contributed to their actions. According to Buyot's account, the group later returned to the wedding reception and served some of Ganay's cooked remains to guests who were still celebrating, although it was unclear whether any guests consumed human flesh without knowing it.

== Investigation ==
The crime was uncovered several days after the wedding when Buyot, one of the suspects and a cousin of Ganay, reported the incident to authorities and confessed his involvement. Buyot went to a local village official, who brought him to the police. Authorities initially had difficulty believing the confession because of the unusual circumstances described. Following Buyot's statement, police searched the surrounding area of Narra. After two days of searching, investigators recovered Ganay's fire-blackened bones, along with pieces of clothing and hair believed to belong to the victim.

Sabtuari Pique later surrendered to authorities, while Eladio and his son Gerald were arrested. Police identified the four men as suspects in the killing and said they were investigating whether any of them could have been connected to other disappearances reported in Palawan since the 1980s. Bacuel described the incident as the first case of its kind she had encountered in the area.

== Aftermath ==
Local officials expressed concern that reports about the incident would discourage visitors from travelling to the town. Bacuel said residents did not want the town to be associated with the crime and described the incident as an "isolated case". Tourism officer Reynaldo de la Rosa also said that the crime occurred in a remote area and that many residents would not have known about it without media coverage. The publicity surrounding the case led to concerns that outsiders would associate the actions of the suspects with the wider community and culture of Narra. They tried to dispel this impression by pointing out that the case was not typical of the town and violent crimes are rare in the place.

The case continued to be among the most unique criminal cases in the Philippines because of the claims that a guest at the wedding was murdered, his body was cremated, and pieces of his body were eaten and served at the wedding.
