= Antonio de Dios =

Antonio de Dios is a "bird aficionado" known in the relevant circles from the Philippines who established in 1975 Birds International, Inc. (not to be confused with BirdLife International, an environmental non-governmental organization and not affiliated with the short-lived quarterly publication Birds International by Joe Forshaw), a company working in the field of aviculture.

== Early years ==
He came from a wealthy family and currently is the President and General Manager of Transport Equipment Corporation, the family business established by his father.

== Aviculture ==
De Dios was interested in animals since his childhood and kept many pets (including several birds) in their family house before proceeding to breeding business. He had become aware of the critical decline of exotic bird population in his country in early 1970s and decided to open a breeding and research facility. He acquired a field of six hectares in Quezon City near Manila, the capital of the Philippines, and established Birds International Incorporated. The location of the center is suitable since the tropical climate of Philippines is conducive to the breeding and propagation of exotic birds. He is also the director of the facility.

The company is the largest captive parrot breeding facility in the world;., not to be confused with the largest 'bird collection in the world' boasting one third of all species existing in captivity which claims title to Dr. Jesus Estudillo Lopez of Mexico City. Mr. de Dios has been labelled "the biggest and most successful breeder of exotic birds in the world" and a successful business venture. It is reputed to have the largest parrot collection in the world.

However Antonio de Dios has also been heavily criticized by some conservationists for his commercial interests in the Spix's macaw, one of the rarest birds in the world, despite his success in captive breeding the species. For example, when he decided to donate some birds to other facilities Natasha Schischakin, a conservationist working on Spix's macaw who is critical of private efforts, stated that "The owner of BII, Antonio de Dios offered to donate these birds to the reintroduction effort, but only with the establishment of rigorous protocols and involvement of his staff in the reintroduction program."

== Publications ==
M. A. R. (1996). "Protocol for red-vented cockatoo at Birds International Inc., Philippines" in European studbook for the red-vented cockatoo.

== See also ==
- Katala Foundation
