= Narra, Palawan =

Municipality in Palawan, Philippines

Narra
- Municipality
- Municipality of Narra
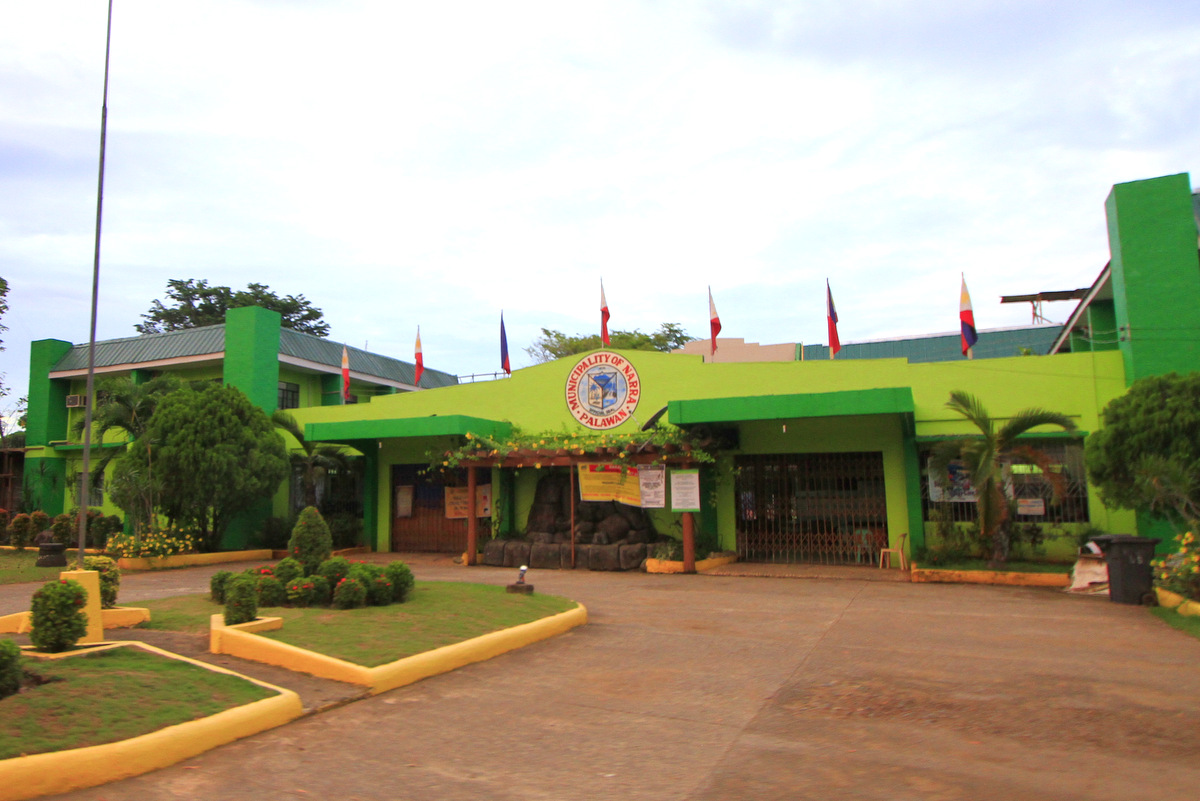
- Municipal Hall

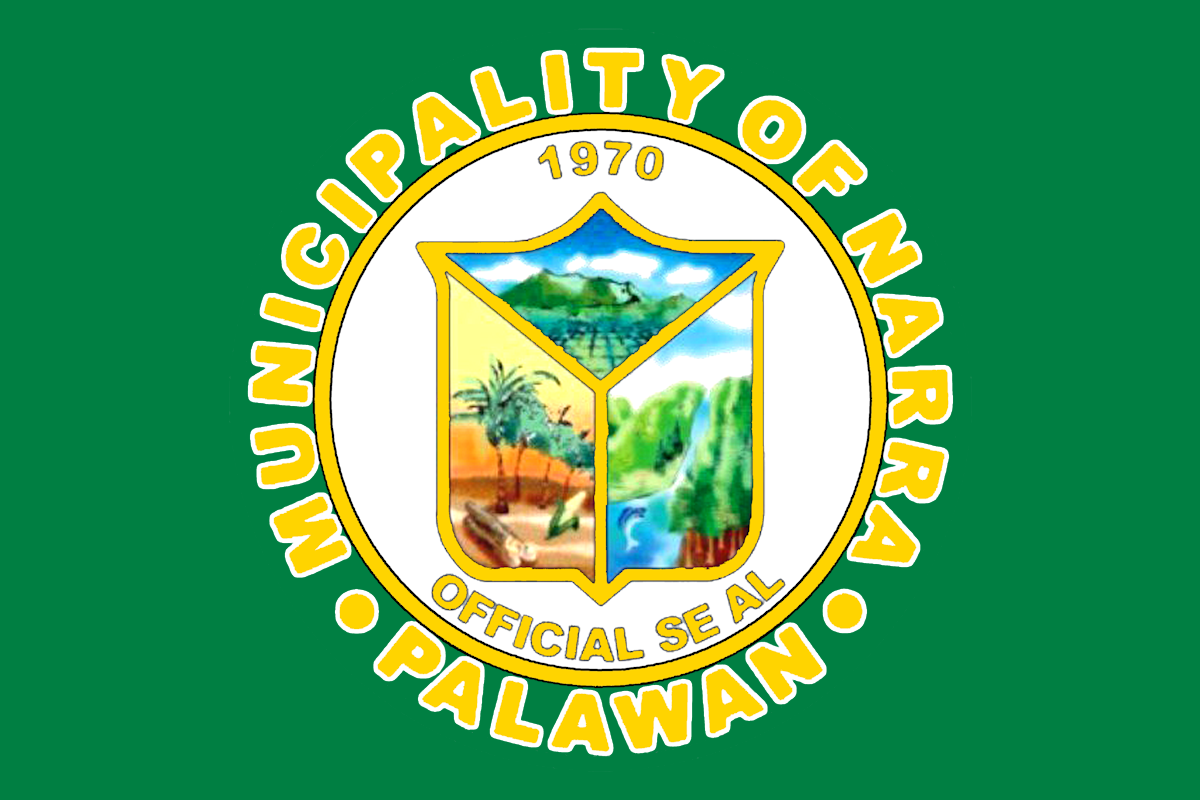
- Flag

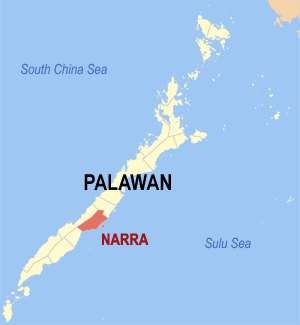
- Map of Palawan with Narra highlighted

- Location within the Philippines
- Coordinates: 9°17′N 118°25′E
- Country: Philippines
- Region: Mimaropa
- Province: Palawan
- District: 2nd district
- Founded: June 21, 1969
- Barangays: 23 (see Barangays)

Government
  - Type: Sangguniang Bayan
  - Mayor: Gerandy B. Danao
  - Vice Mayor: Edmond B. Gastanes
  - Representative: Jose Ch. Alvarez
  - Municipal Council: Members: Joel Bito-onon; Janet G. Nabua; Arnold V. Verano; Cenon P. Garcia; Francisco T. Atchera Jr.; Amelia G. Gimpaya; Ceferino M. Genovea; Christene Joy T. Mahilum
  - Electorate: 48,298 voters (2025)

Area
  - Total: 831.73 km^{2} (321.13 sq mi)
- Elevation: 21 m (69 ft)
- Highest elevation: 368 m (1,207 ft)
- Lowest elevation: 0 m (0 ft)

Population (2024 census)
  - Total: 80,572
  - Density: 96.873/km^{2} (250.90/sq mi)
  - Households: 19,513

Economy
  - Income class: 1st municipal income class
  - Poverty incidence: 16% (2023)
  - Revenue: ₱ 562.5 million (2024)
  - Assets: ₱ 1,740 million (2024)
  - Expenditure: ₱ 479.8 million (2024)
  - Liabilities: ₱ 620.4 million (2024)

Service provider
  - Electricity: Palawan Electric Cooperative (PALECO)
- Time zone: UTC+8 (PST)
- ZIP code: 5303
- PSGC: 1705315000
- IDD : area code: +63 (0)48
- Native languages: Palawano; Tagalog

Narra, officially the Municipality of Narra (Tagalog: Bayan ng Narra), is a municipality in the province of Palawan, Philippines. According to the 2024 census, it has a population of 80,572 people.

The town is known as the Rice Granary of Palawan because it is the province’s main rice producer. The municipality holds the Palay Festival, formerly called Anihan Festival (Reaping or Harvesting), every mid or late October.

== History ==
=== Colonial era ===
During the Spanish and American era, it was a part of Aborlan.

=== Modern era ===
In 1947, the agricultural potential for Narra was discovered, hence the area was developed as a farmland and as site for future resettlements.

Besides spelling out the local name for the Pterocarpus indicus—the Philippines' national tree—it is an acronym for National Resettlement Rehabilitation Administration. This program, established on June 18, 1954, resettled landless people from Luzon to Palawan. On June 21, 1969, the Municipality of Narra was created by virtue of Republic Act No. 5642 signed by President Ferdinand Marcos, separating it from its mother town of Aborlan.

== Geography ==
Narra is 92 kilometres (57 mi) from Puerto Princesa. It includes Rasa Island, home of the endangered endemic cockatoo species called "Katala or Abukay or Kalangay (depends on local dialect)" or Philippine red-vented cockatoo (cacatua haematuropygia) and other rare animal species.

=== Barangays ===
Narra is politically subdivided into 23 barangays. Each barangay consists of puroks and some have sitios.

- Antipuluan
- Aramaywan
- Bagong Sikat
- Batang-batang
- Bato-bato (San Isidro)
- Burirao
- Caguisan
- Calategas
- Dumagueña
- Elvita
- Estrella Village
- Ipilan
- Malatgao
- Malinao
- Narra (Poblacion)
- Panacan
- Panacan 2
- Princess Urduja
- Sandoval
- Tacras
- Taritien
- Teresa
- Tinagong Dagat

=== Climate ===
Climate data for Narra, Palawan
Month	Jan	Feb	Mar	Apr	May	Jun	Jul	Aug	Sep	Oct	Nov	Dec	Year
Mean daily maximum °C (°F)	30 (86)	30 (86)	31 (88)	31 (88)	31 (88)	30 (86)	29 (84)	29 (84)	29 (84)	29 (84)	29 (84)	29 (84)	30 (86)
Mean daily minimum °C (°F)	24 (75)	24 (75)	24 (75)	25 (77)	25 (77)	25 (77)	25 (77)	25 (77)	25 (77)	25 (77)	25 (77)	24 (75)	25 (76)
Average precipitation mm (inches)	85 (3.3)	69 (2.7)	100 (3.9)	105 (4.1)	202 (8.0)	246 (9.7)	241 (9.5)	215 (8.5)	236 (9.3)	262 (10.3)	231 (9.1)	144 (5.7)	2,136 (84.1)
Average rainy days	15.6	13.3	17.5	19.9	27.4	28.1	29.4	28.6	28.6	28.8	26.4	21.0	284.6
Source: Meteoblue

== Demographics ==
Population census of Narra

Year	Pop.	±% p.a.
1970	18,549	—
1975	25,256	+6.39%
1980	30,099	+3.57%
1990	41,326	+3.22%
1995	48,339	+2.98%
2000	56,845	+3.54%

Year	Pop.	±% p.a.
2007	62,525	+1.32%
2010	65,264	+1.57%
2015	73,212	+2.21%
2020	77,948	+1.33%
2024	80,572	+0.80%

Source: Philippine Statistics Authority

In the 2024 census, the population of Narra was 80,572 people, with a density of 97 inhabitants per square kilometre or 250 inhabitants per square mile.

=== Religion ===
Based on religion in 2024, the population of the municipality of Narra was almost entirely Christianity (99.3%), then there were also other religious minorities (0.4%), and also Islam (0.3%). The population is mostly Roman Catholic, settlers from Luzon, while other religions include Buddhism and Chinese religions, as well as Islam, which is practiced by a small number of native Palawano and Moro immigrants.

== Economy ==
Poverty incidence of Narra (%)

Source: Philippine Statistics Authority

== Education ==
There are two schools district offices which govern all educational institutions within the municipality. They oversee the management and operations of all private and public, from primary to secondary schools. These are the Narra I Schools District, and Narra II Schools District.

=== Primary and elementary schools ===
- Antipuluan Elementary School
- Aramaywan I Elementary School
- Aramaywan II Elementary School
- Bagong Sikat Elementary School
- Bagong Sikat Adventist Elementary School
- Batang-Batang Beach Elementary School
- Batang-Batang Proper Elementary School
- Bethlehem Elementary School
- Buong Elementary School
- Burirao Annex Elementary School
- Burirao Proper Elementary School
- Cabuluan Elementary School
- Cacarigan Elementary School
- Caguisan Elementary School
- Calategas Elementary School
- Central Palawan United Methodist Academy
- Checedh Christian School
- Damayan Bliss Elementary School
- Dumangueña Bible Baptist Church School
- Dumangueña Elementary School
- Elvita Elementary School
- Estrella Village Elementary School
- Ipilan Elementary School
- Malatgao Elementary School
- Malinao Elementary School
- Manaile Elementary School
- Maranan Elementary School
- Mariwara Elementary School
- Narra Adventist Elementary School
- Narra Bible Baptist Christian Academy
- Narra Pilot School
- Narra West Elementary School (Pilot West ES)
- Palawan Adventist Academy
- Panacan Elementary School
- Princess Urduja Elementary School
- San Isidro Elementary School
- Sandoval Elementary School
- Tacras Elementary School
- Taritien Annex Elementary School
- Taritien Elementary School
- Teresa Elementary School
- Tinagong Dagat Elementary School
- Upper Lapu lapu Elementary School

=== Secondary schools ===
- Aramaywan National High School
- Bagong Sikat National High School
- Burirao National High School
- Calategas National High School
- Dumangeña National High School
- Estrella Village National High School
- Lapu-Lapu National High School
- Malatgao National High School
- Narra National High School
- Panacan National High School
- Princess Urduja National High School
- San Francisco Javier College
- Sandoval National High School

== Gallery ==
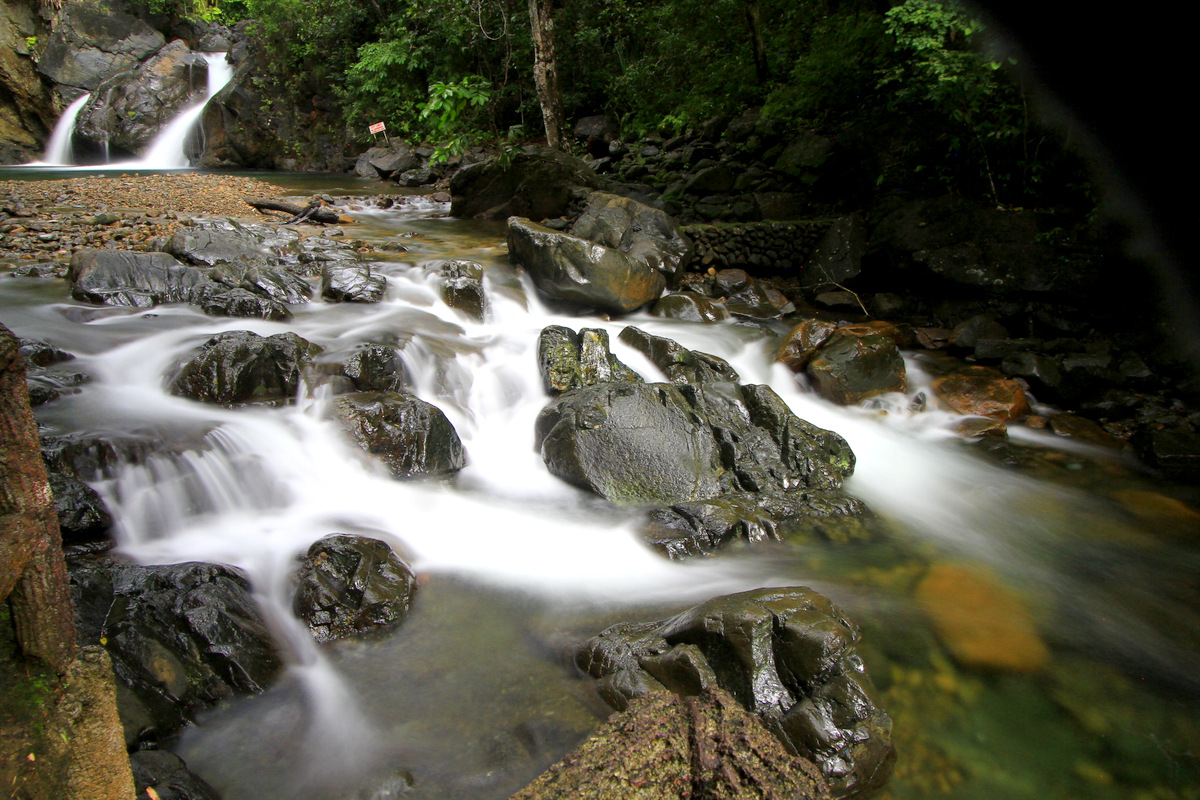
Estrella Falls

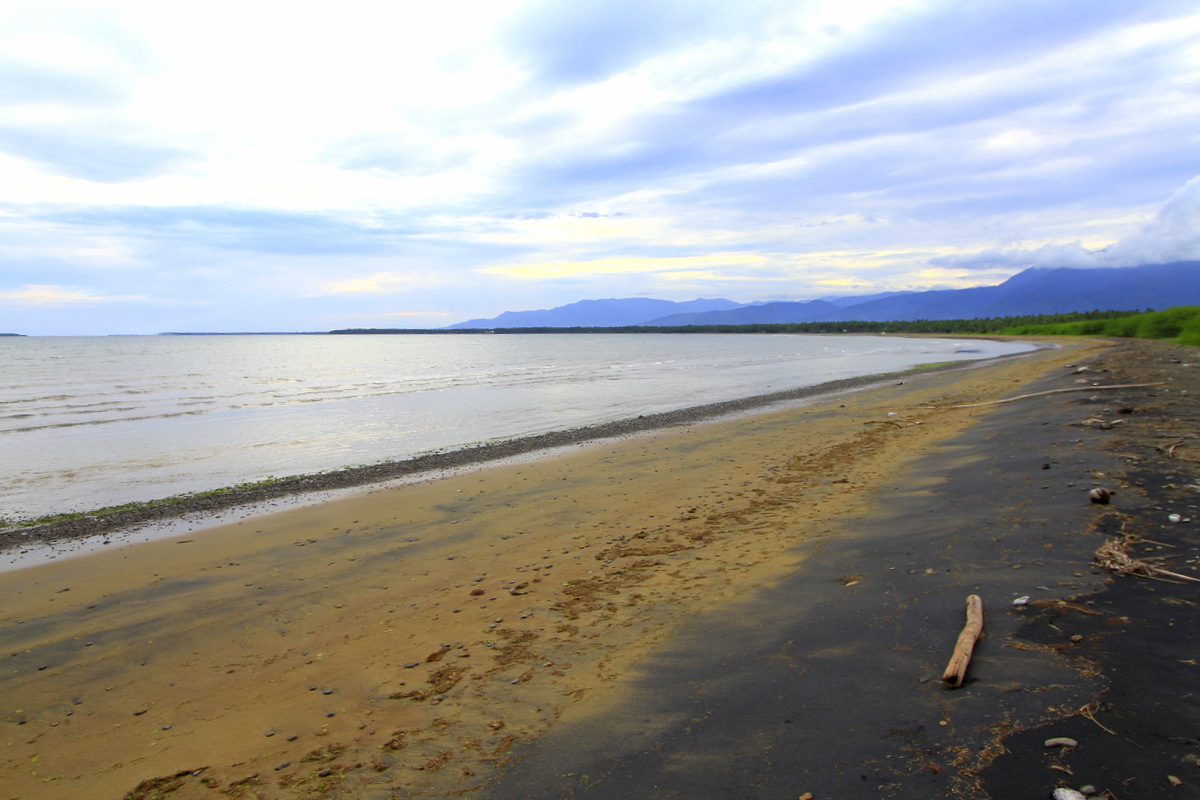
Malatgao Beach

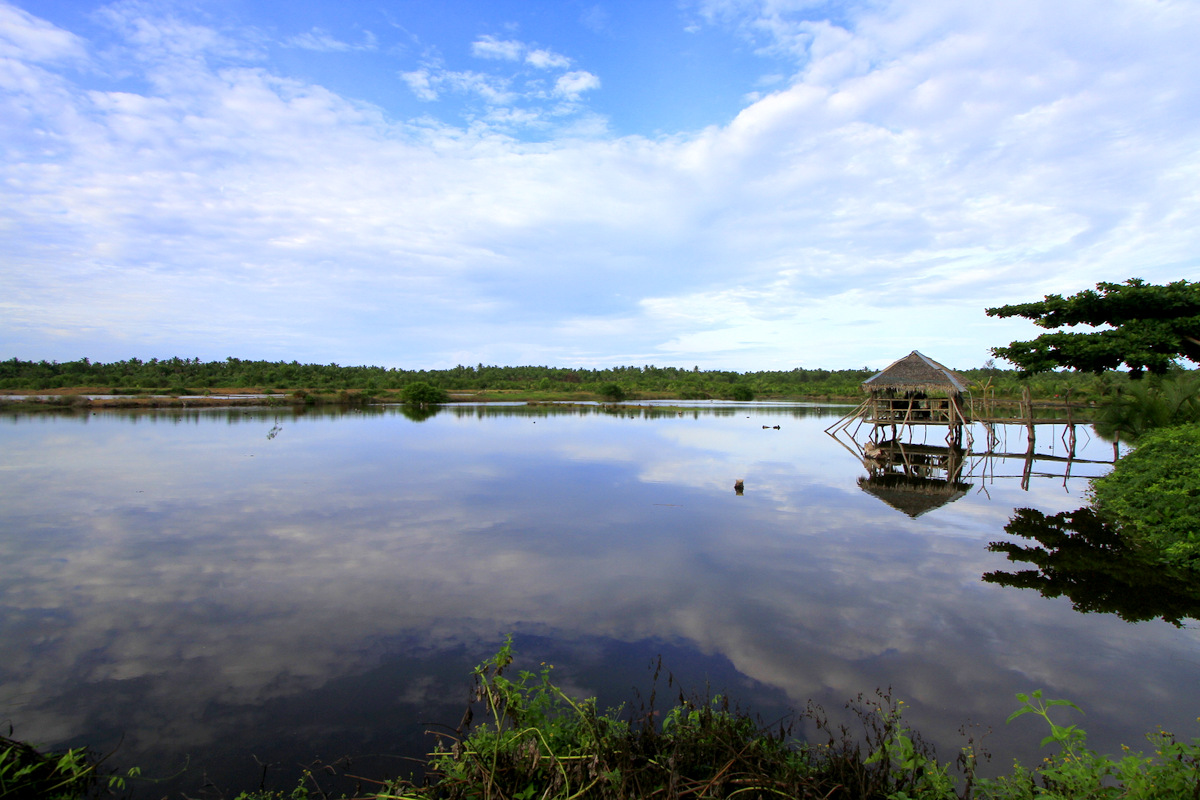
Fish Pond in Malatgao

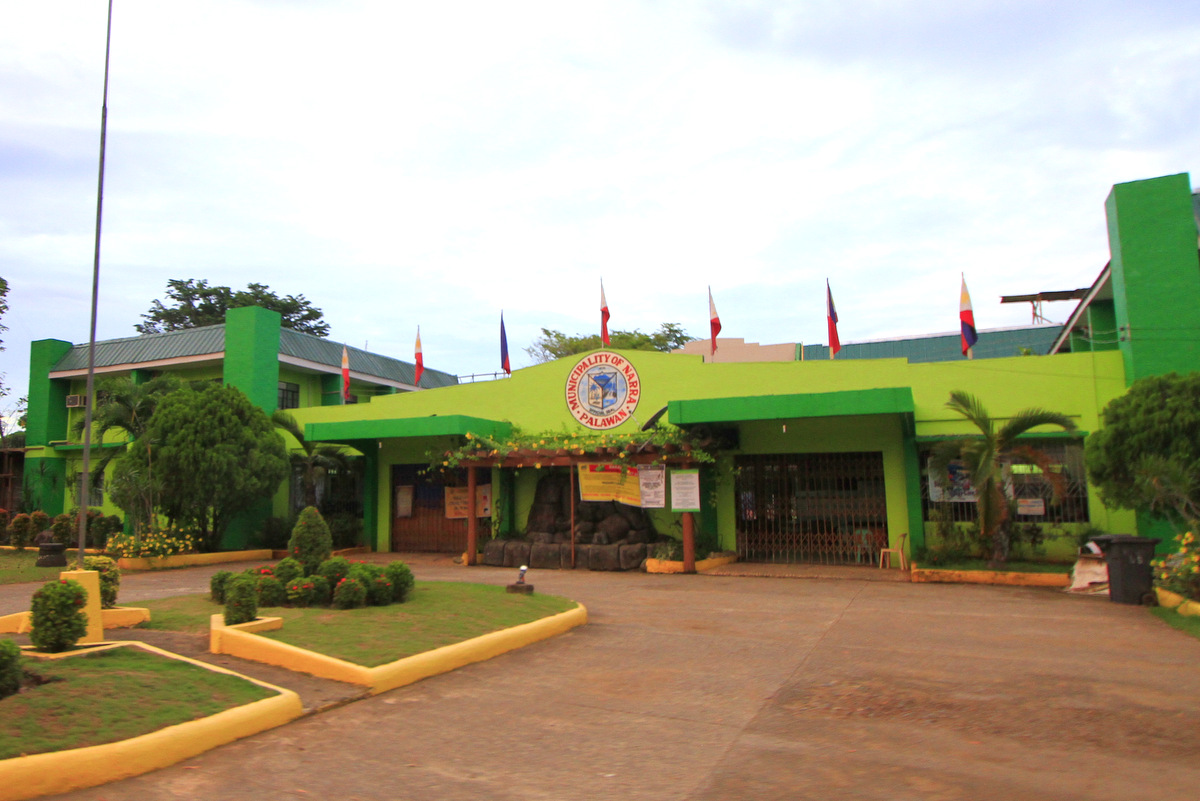
Narra Municipal Hall

== Notable personalities ==
- Janicel Lubina, Filipino beauty pageant titleholder and actress
