= Harmony: A New Way of Looking at Our World =

2010 book by Charles III

- Author: Charles III; Tony Juniper; Ian Skelly
- Publisher: Harper
- Pages: 336
- Awards: Nautilus Book Award
- ISBN: 0061731358
- OCLC: 419857221

Harmony: A New Way of Looking at Our World is a 2010 book written by Charles, Prince of Wales (later King Charles III), with Tony Juniper and Ian Skelly. The book focuses on the world's environment which includes climate change, architecture and agriculture. The book has been translated into many different languages. There is also a children's edition of Harmony.

== Reception ==
In a review in The Guardian, Rowan Moore said that Harmony: A New Way of Looking at Our World contained a number of "amateurish" mistakes, and was also inconsistent in its use of science—embracing scientific evidence when it supported a belief in climate change, but ignored scientific evidence that cast doubt on alternative medicine. He added "he can employ people to do his reading for him. Two such loyal readers-cum-scribes, Tony Juniper and Ian Skelly, presumably wrote the hard bits of this book".

In 2018, Edzard Ernst wrote that "Harmony is full of praise for even the most absurd forms of alternative therapies and bogus diagnostic tests." In Ernst's book More Good Than Harm? The Moral Maze of Complementary and Alternative Medicine he and ethicist Kevin Smith call Charles "foolish and immoral" and "conclude that it is not possible to practice alternative medicine ethically". Ernst said that the prince's private secretary contacted the vice chancellor of Exeter University to investigate Ernst's complaints against the Smallwood Report which Charles had commissioned in 2005. While Ernst was "found not to be guilty of any wrong-doing, all local support at Exeter stopped, which eventually led to my early retirement."

== Awards and recognition ==
In 2010 an hour-long documentary, Harmony, directed by Academy Award and Directors Guild Award nominee Stuart Sender and narrated by Charles was broadcast on the US NBC network. Alessandra Stanley in The New York Times called it "breathtaking and beautifully filmed", but that "there is something a bit stagy and embarrassing to his presentation" and "the back story and ulterior motives of its star at times blunt the show's stated purpose". The film premiered at the 2012 Sundance Film Festival, and was praised by Robert Redford.

The book received a Nautilus Book Award in 2011. The theme of the 2025 Royal Windsor Flower Show, ‘Patterns in Nature’, was inspired by this book.
