= Tony Juniper =

British environmentalist and conservationist

(Hon) Dr Anthony Thomas Juniper CBE CEnv HonFSE HonFRGS
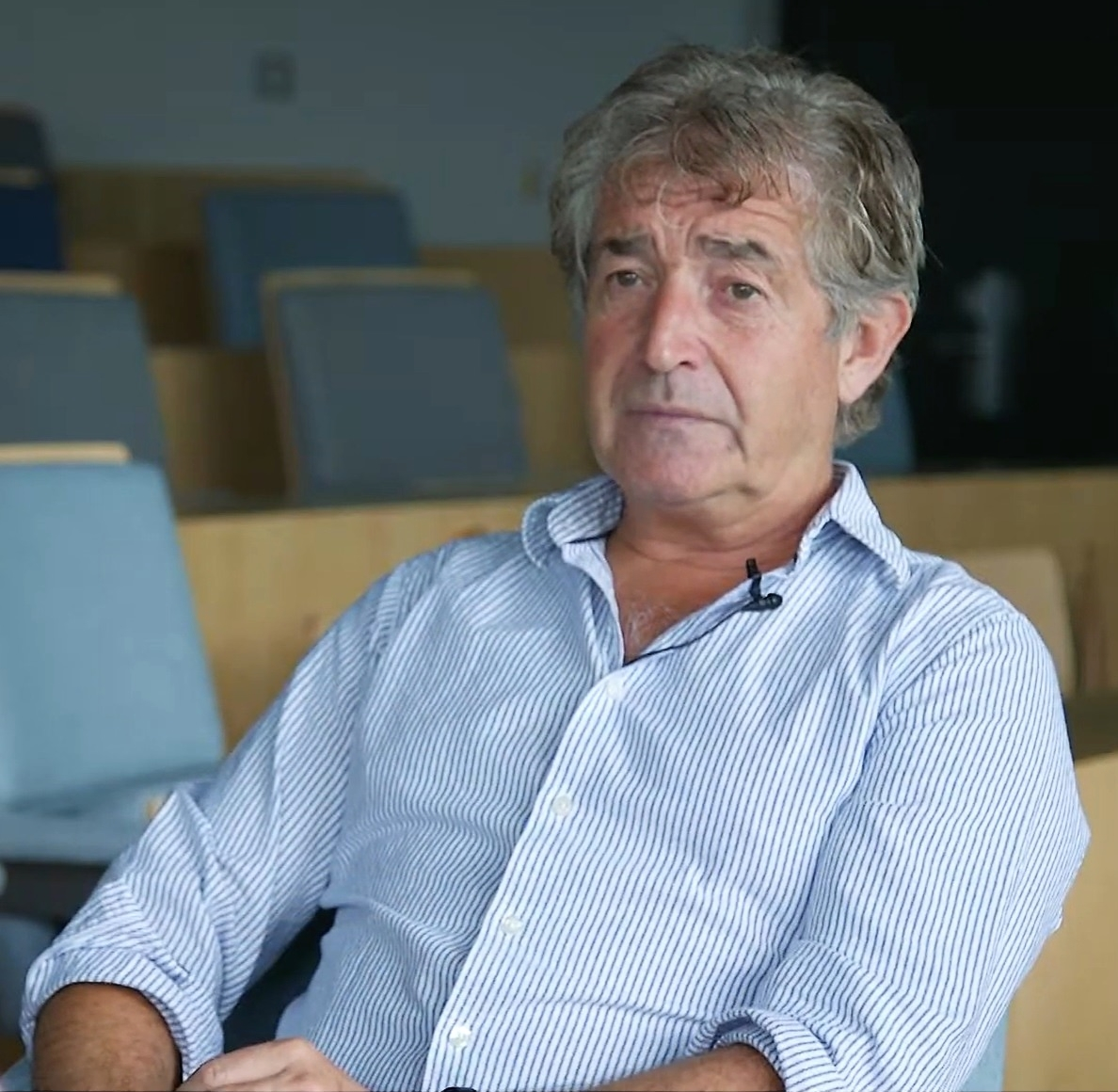
- Juniper in 2018
- Born: Anthony Thomas Juniper; 24 September 1960 (age 66); Oxford, England
- Education: University of Bristol (BSc); University College London (MSc)
- Known for: Parrot conservation, especially the Spix's macaw
- Notable work: Harmony: A New Way of Looking at Our World (2010) with Charles, Prince of Wales and Ian Skelly
- Title: Chair of Natural England
- Term: 2019–present
- Website: tonyjuniper.com

Tony Juniper CBE (born 24 September 1960) is a British ornithologist, environmentalist, sustainability adviser and writer.

He was executive director of Friends of the Earth (England, Wales and Northern Ireland) between 2003 and 2008 and vice chair of Friends of the Earth International between 2000 and 2008.

He was the Green Party's candidate for Cambridge at the 2010 general election. He was appointed chair of Natural England in 2019.

== Early life ==
Juniper was born in Oxford, and is the son of Austin Juniper and Constance Elliston, who married in Oxford in 1951. His mother was a waitress and his father, a WWII veteran, worked at Plant Oxford.

He grew up in Oxford, where he developed an early interest in natural history. He attended St Christopher's primary school in Cowley and Temple Cowley secondary modern, transferring to the former Oxford boys' grammar school (after it became a comprehensive). He worked for a year at Raymond Blanc's restaurant Le Manoir aux Quat'Saisons.

Juniper attended the University of Bristol, where he was awarded a joint honours BSc in psychology and zoology in 1983, a choice reflecting his interest in animal behaviour. He spent much of that time exploring south west England, including the Mendip Hills and Somerset Levels. He went on to gain an MSc and diploma in nature conservation from University College London in 1988.

== Career ==
=== Early career ===
Juniper began his conservation career with the South Oxfordshire Countryside Education Trust between 1984–85, a project run through the Berkshire, Buckinghamshire and Oxfordshire Naturalists' Trust. He then worked for Saudi Arabia's National Commission for Wildlife Conservation and Development (now National Center for Wildlife) while studying for his MSc in 1988. After a period of freelance research, he joined the International Council for Bird Preservation (now BirdLife International) as a parrot conservation officer in 1989.

=== Friends of the Earth ===
He joined Friends of the Earth in 1990 as a senior campaigner, leading the organisation's tropical rainforest campaign in the UK and internationally. He took forward its work on biodiversity and forests from 1993, and later became involved in transport policy, leading Friends of the Earth's campaign against the Newbury bypass. He became campaigns director in 1995 and policy and campaigns director in 1998, playing a leading part in initiatives on GM crops, world trade and industrial pollution. He chaired the Link legislation group which resulted in the Countryside and Rights of Way Act 2000 – establishing a public right to roam over open uplands and common land, reformed public rights of way and strengthened nature conservation protections.

Juniper became executive director for Friends of the Earth (England, Wales and Northern Ireland) in 2003–08 and oversaw the campaign that secured the inclusion of a Climate Change Bill in the November 2006 Queen's Speech. This was achieved through Friends of the Earth's Big Ask campaign over 2005–08, when Juniper worked with Radiohead's Thom Yorke. The resulting Climate Change Act 2008 was the first of its kind and has been a model copied around the world. It obliged the UK Government to reduce net greenhouse gas emissions, established a system of five-year carbon budgets and an independent Committee on Climate Change to advise on targets. It originally set a target of reducing UK greenhouse gas emissions by at least 80% below 1990 levels by 2050, which was strengthened in 2019 to a net zero (100% reduction relative to 1990) target.

=== Other roles ===
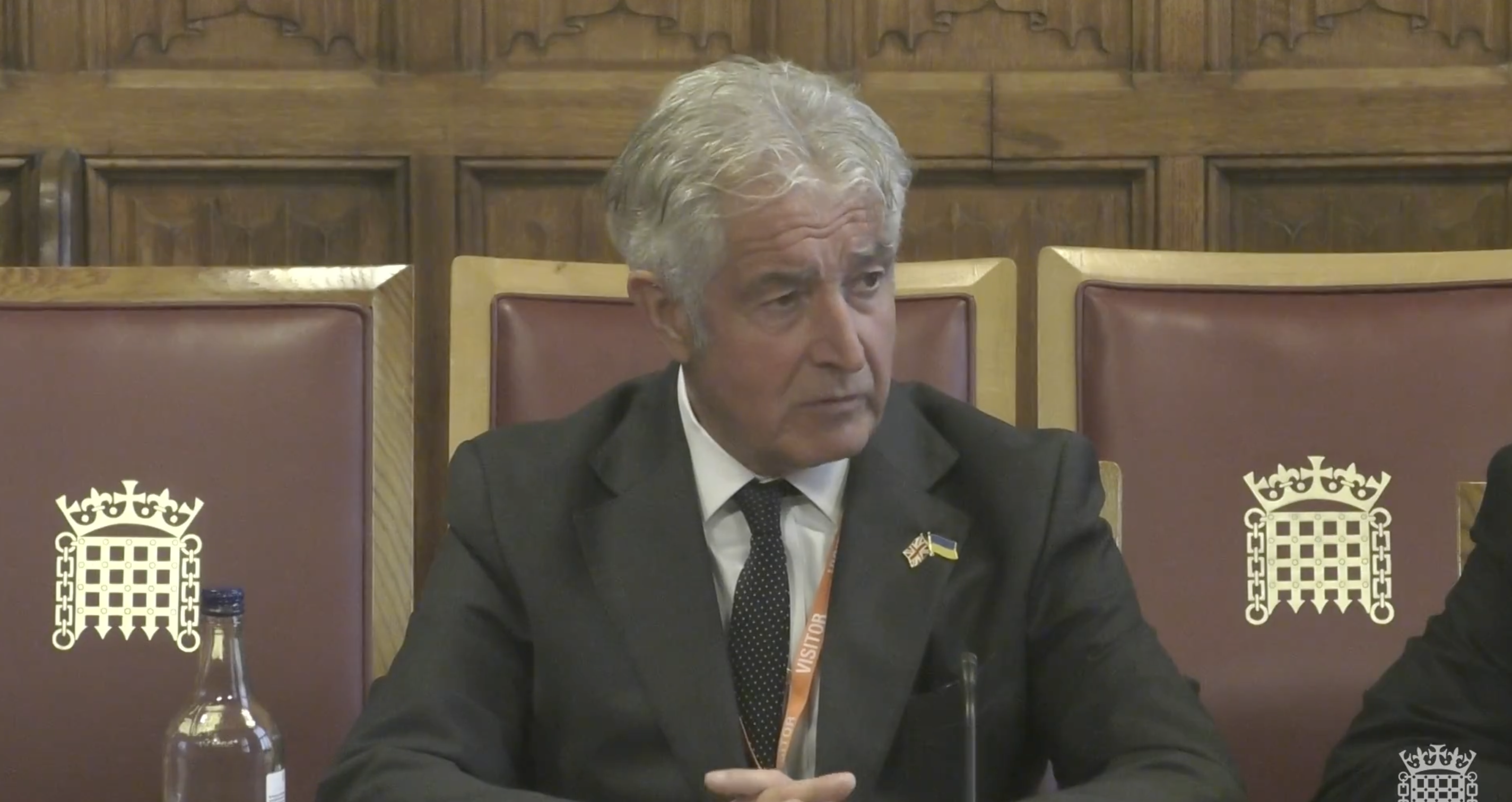
Juniper giving evidence to the Environment and Climate Change Committee, House of Lords (April 2025)

Juniper has acted as a special adviser to the Prince of Wales Charities Foundation international sustainability unit and the Prince's Rainforests Project. He is a fellow of the Cambridge Institute for Sustainability Leadership and has chaired the rainforest charity Cool Earth and been a council member of Fauna & Flora International.

He has advised Union Bancaire Privée as an impact advisory board member and as co-chair of its biodiversity recovery fund advisory committee. In addition, Juniper has advised companies including Danone, Skanska and Interserve assisting with their sustainability strategies – and was a co-founder of the Robertsbridge Group, which provides advice to companies on sustainability matters.

In 2008, Juniper was one of the authors of the Green New Deal Group report A Green New Deal, which proposed tackling the financial crisis, climate change and energy insecurity together. Between 2007–12, Juniper was a director of Climate for Ideas, a climate communications organisation. He was also on the advisory board of Sandbag, a climate policy think tank.

In 2009, he became an ambassador for the National Trust's Wicken Fen Vision, a landscape-scale conservation project in Cambridgeshire – and a trustee of the Bedfordshire, Cambridgeshire and Northamptonshire Wildlife Trust. He later served as president of the Royal Society of Wildlife Trusts between 2015–19, promoting the need for a "historic turnaround for nature" and advocating for habitat restoration.

Juniper chaired 10:10 Climate Action (now Possible) and the advisory board of Action for Renewables. He has been a patron of the Chartered Institute of Ecology and Environmental Management since 2012. He was an expert panel member of Bioregional's One Planet Communities programme, and an advisor to the Science Museum, London as part of its Atmosphere exhibition.

Between 2017–19, Juniper was executive director of WWF-UK, where he led the organisation's advocacy, policy engagement and campaigning efforts. This included oversight of WWF-UK's participation in Greener UK during the development of post-Brexit environmental governance. During this time, Juniper argued that ecological restoration should be central to economic policy, contending that recovering the natural environment is "one of the soundest investments that society can make" – rather than a cost. He also wrote that overconsumption of animal protein is a pressure on the world's soils, contending that reduced consumption of livestock-based food and less food waste would lower agricultural land use.

== Natural England ==
In March 2019, the Environment Secretary Michael Gove proposed Juniper as chair of Natural England, the government's statutory adviser on the natural environment in England. As a condition of his appointment, the Environment, Food and Rural Affairs and Environmental Audit select committees required him to refrain from political activity and divest his interests in the Robertsbridge Group. He also relinquished his membership of the Green Party and stepped down from WWF-UK. He took up the post in April 2019 and served as an ex officio member of the Defra board between 2019–24.

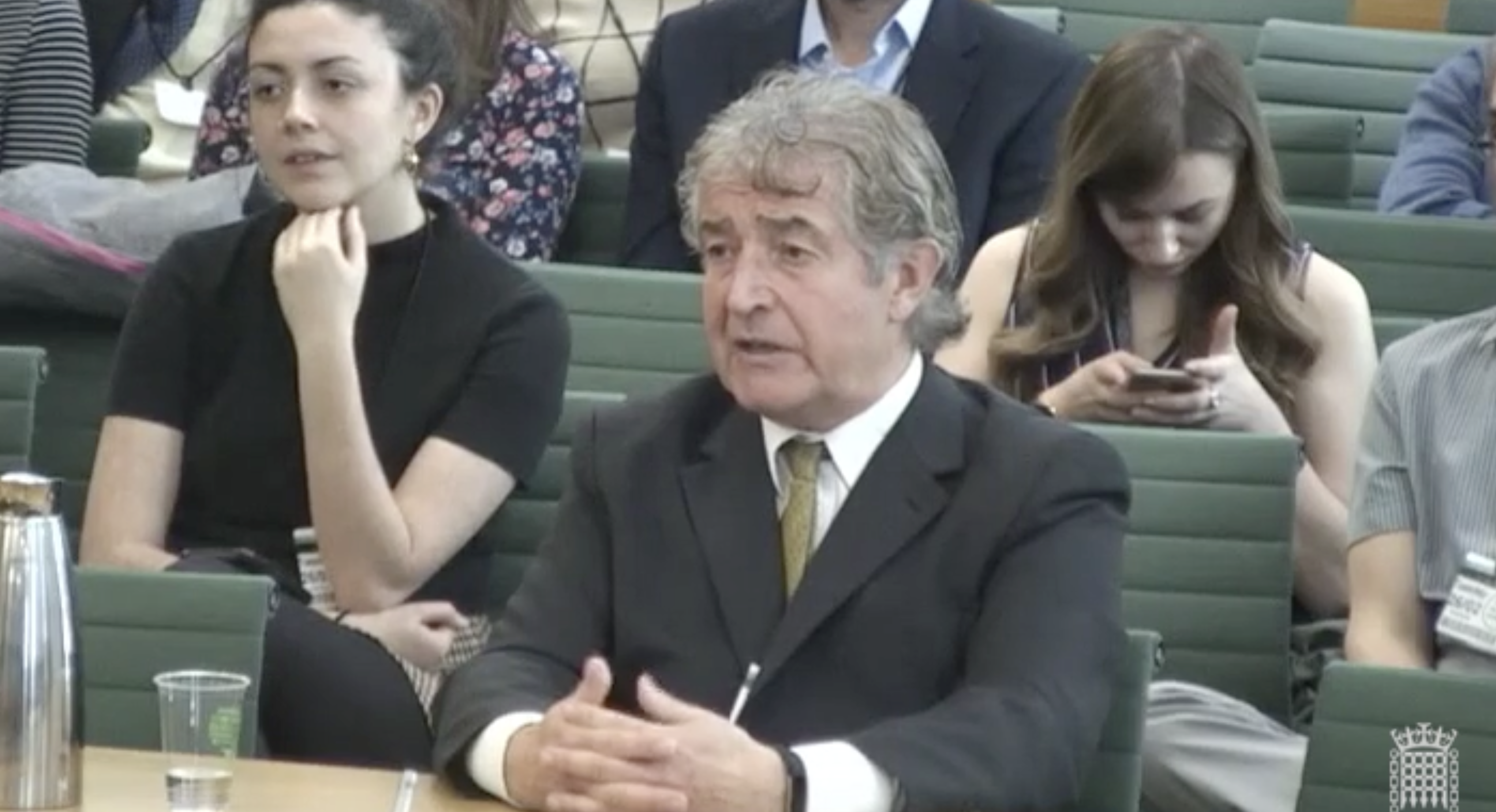
Juniper giving evidence at his pre-appointment hearing for the role of Natural England chair before the EFRA Committee and the Environmental Audit Committee, House of Commons (26 February 2019)

Juniper was reappointed for a second term in December 2021, and for a third term in March 2025, running from April 2025 to April 2027, making him the longest-serving chair of Natural England. During his chairmanship, the agency oversaw the introduction of biodiversity net gain, landscape-scale nature recovery projects and the King's Series of national nature reserves. Its budget has roughly tripled from its 2019 level.

Natural England acts as the licensing authority for the badger cull, conducted under Defra policy to control bovine tuberculosis. Juniper, who had voiced reservations about the cull before his appointment, said he would be guided by the evidence and that the policy was set by ministers; though some conservationists criticised the agency for licensing the killing of a protected species. In May 2026, Defra confirmed that badger culling had effectively ended in England, with a planned shift towards vaccination.

In 2025, as Natural England took on a role administering a developer-funded nature restoration fund under the UK Government's planning reforms, Juniper publicly disputed ministers' suggestions that nature was blocking development, saying the claim was not fully backed by evidence. Critics also questioned a potential conflict of interest in the agency receiving developer funds while also regulating development. Defending Natural England's role, Juniper rejected the idea that nature and development were opposed, telling a parliamentary inquiry session that "it is not either–or, they are co-dependent".

Asked about the HS2 "bat tunnel", a £100m structure built to protect rare bats and criticised as wasteful, Juniper said in 2025 that the agency wanted fewer such schemes, arguing the funds would have been better used expanding the bats' habitat – and citing it as an example of the site-by-site approach the agency was moving away from. In 2025, Natural England adopted a new strategy, Recovering Nature for Growth, Health and Security, reframing nature recovery as underpinning economic development, public health and national security.

Juniper has supported the ecological case for reintroducing predators such as the lynx, comparing an ecosystem without them to "a watch with some of the cogs pulled out". Around the publication of his 2015 book What Nature Does for Britain, Juniper advocated for a Nature and Wellbeing Act – a legal framework for nature recovery modelled on the Climate Change Act – endorsed by the Wildlife Trusts and RSPB. In 2020, he addressed the UK Climate Assembly, a parliamentary-commissioned citizens' assembly, briefing members on how the UK could reach net zero and on the links between climate change and biodiversity.

== Parrot conservation ==
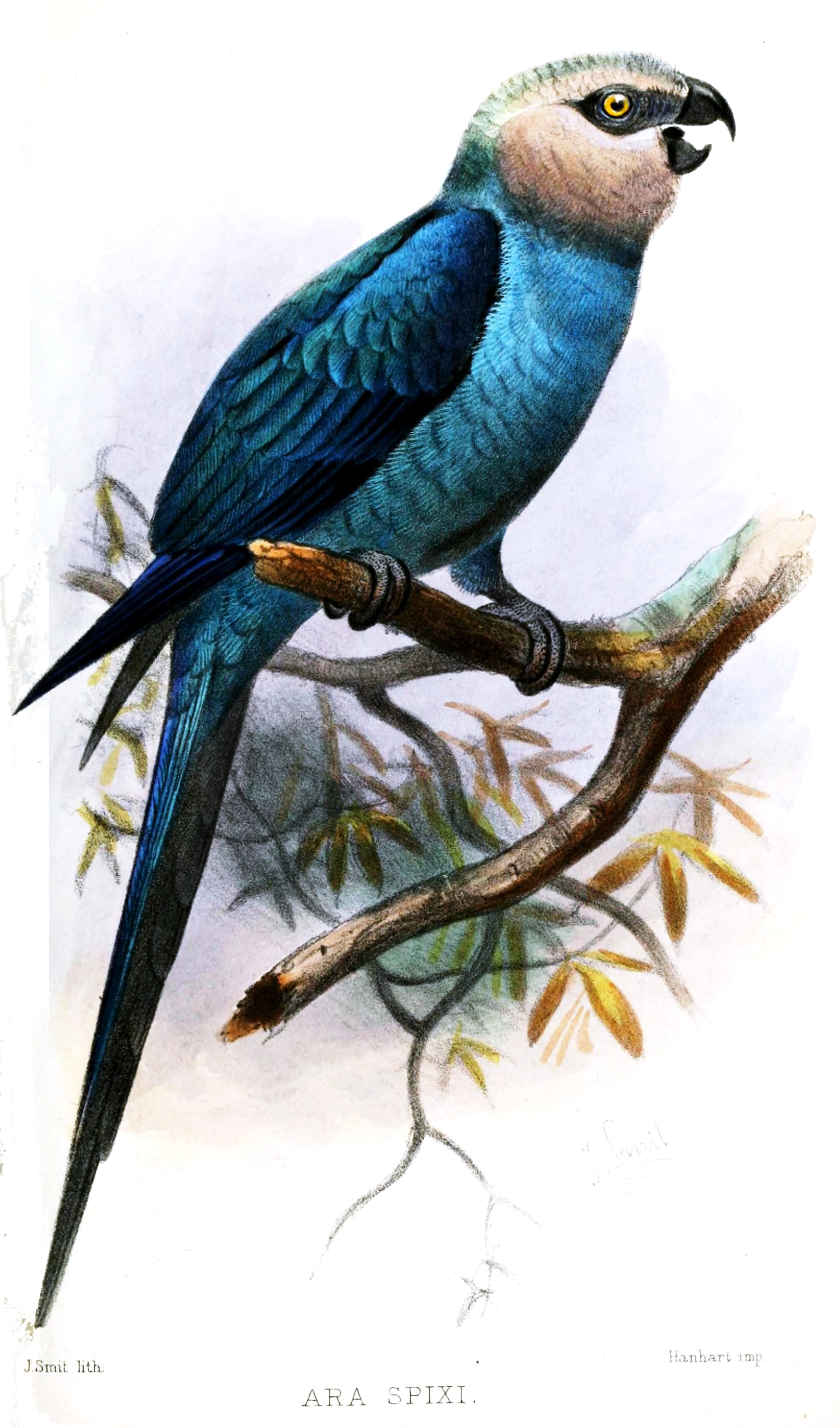
Spix's macaw (Cyanopsitta spixii), also known as (the little) blue macaw

Juniper is a recognised authority on parrots. He worked at BirdLife International on efforts to conserve rare species of these birds, co-launching its Protect the Parrots campaign in 1989 which first advocated for an EU trade ban of the species. In 1990, with Brazilian ornithologist Carlos Yamashita, Juniper located the last known Spix's macaw in the wild. In 2000, he also worked with the Oriental Bird Club in Thailand to help save the critcally endangered Gurney's pitta. His book Parrots of the World with Mike Parr was recommended by the Library Association as Reference Book of 1999.

Juniper was a member of the World Parrot Trust's scientific committee between 2003–07. In his 2003 book Spix's Macaw he criticised private holders of birds – such as Antonio de Dios's Birds International – arguing that Spix's macaws should be returned to their native Brazil for captive breeding and reintroduction to their declining natural habitat. He has claimed that the 2011 film Rio is based on his 2003 book.

== Political campaigns ==
In January 2009, Juniper was selected as the Green Party's parliamentary candidate in the 2010 general election for the Cambridge constituency. He campaigned on combining economic and environmental renewal, arguing that the established approach of prioritising growth first and the environment later had failed. Radiohead's Thom Yorke, with whom he had worked on the Big Ask campaign, played a benefit gig in support. Juniper finished in fourth place, receiving 7.6% of the vote – an increase of 4.7 percentage points compared with the previous election. Prior to the 2015 general election, Juniper was one of several public figures who endorsed the parliamentary candidacy of Caroline Lucas.

== Media appearances ==
Juniper has written regularly for The Guardian, and since at least 1999. Between 2009–12, he was editor-in-chief of Green magazine, first published with National Geographic and later with The Guardian. He also wrote a green living column for The Sunday Times between 2009–10.

In a 2014 TEDxWWF talk on bioeconomy, Juniper contended that economic systems must sustain the biosphere on which they depend, and that the economy should be understood as "a subset of nature, not the other way around". In his 2012 TEDxExeter talk, he argued that the economy should be regarded "as a wholly owned subsidiary of ecology and the natural environment".

In March 2025, Juniper discussed his book Just Earth on Channel 4 News, arguing that environmental degradation and social inequality are closely connected and that the Earth's resources should be shared more fairly. He was the subject of an episode of the BBC Radio 4 programme The Life Scientific in March 2026, when he discussed his career with Jim Al-Khalili.

== Recognition ==
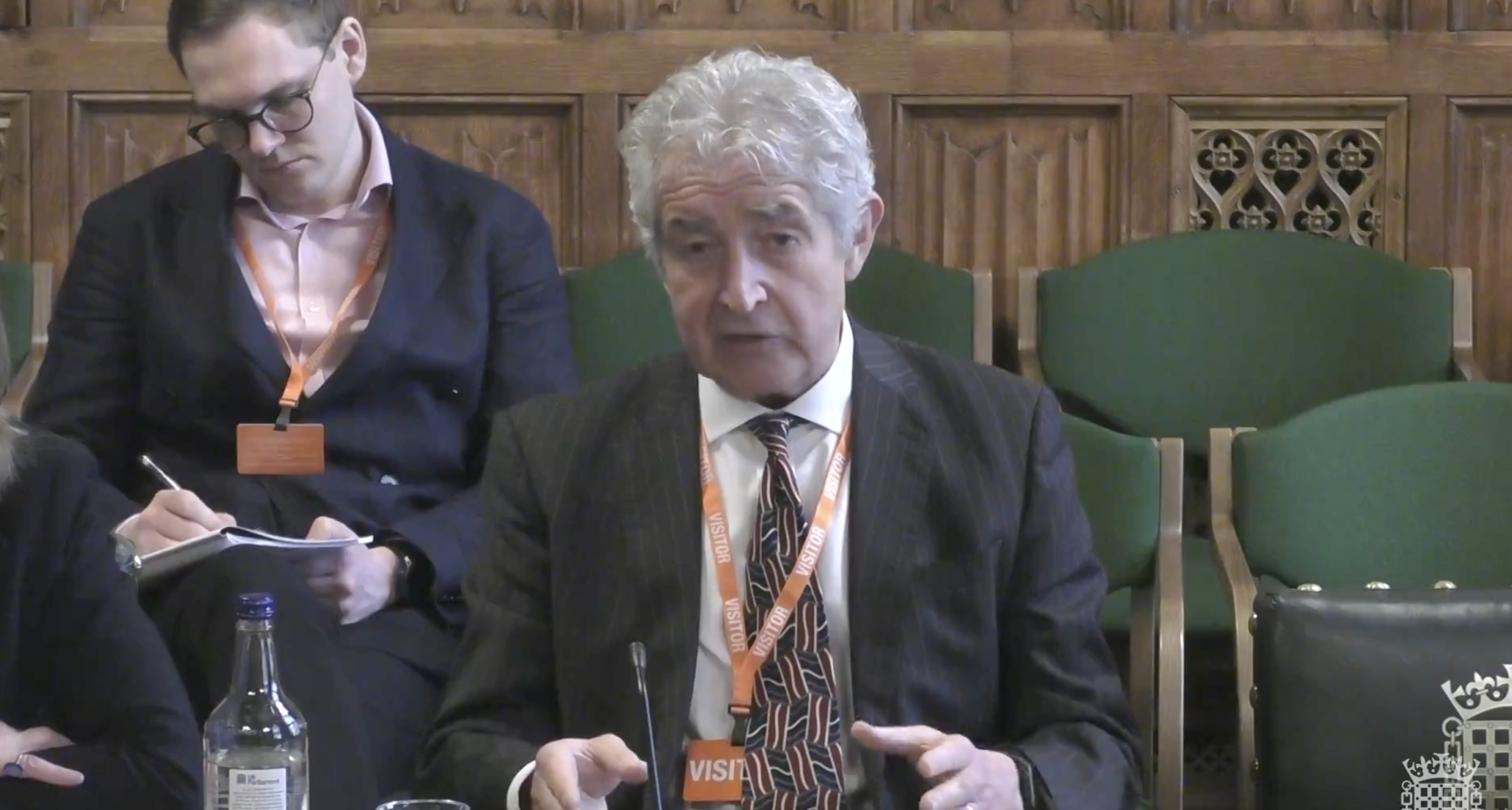
Juniper giving evidence to the Environment, Food and Rural Affairs Committee in the House of Commons (March 2026)

Juniper was ranked 26th in an Environment Agency list of "the greatest eco-heroes of all time" (2006) and 25th in a Country Life list of the 100 "most influential figures shaping the countryside" (2005). In 2008, he was described as one of Britain's "most effective eco-warriors" by The Independent (2008) and one of the "top ten environmental figures of the last 30 years" by The ENDS Report (2008).

He was made a Commander of the Order of the British Empire in the 2017 Birthday Honours for services to conservation. In 2009, he was the inaugural recipient of the Rothschild Medal, created by the Royal Society of Wildlife Trusts in honour of Charles and Miriam Rothschild. In 2013, he received a Chromy Award from the Conscience Institute in Monaco.

In 2014, he was awarded the professional qualification of chartered environmentalist by CIEEM and received the CIEEM Medal in 2023. Juniper is an honorary fellow of the Institute of Environmental Sciences (2008), the Society for the Environment (2023), the Royal Geographical Society (2024) and the Landscape Institute (2025).

Juniper received honorary DSc degrees from the University of Bristol and the University of Plymouth in 2013 – and also from the University of the West of England in 2022. He was appointed professor of practice at the University of Wales Trinity Saint David in 2016, where the teaching draws on the concept of "harmony" explored in Harmony which Juniper co-authored with the then Prince of Wales and Ian Skelly in 2010.

== Personal life ==
Juniper met Sue Sparkes during his first week at the University of Bristol and they married in 1990. They have two sons, Nye and Sam, and one daughter, Maddie, and live in Cambridgeshire. A keen birder since his youth, Juniper also enjoys fishing.

== Publications ==
- Juniper, Tony; Parr, Mike (1998). Parrots: A Guide to the Parrots of the World. Illustrated by Franklin, Kim; Restall, Robin L. Pica Press. ISBN 978-1873403402.
- Juniper, Tony (2018). Rainforest: Dispatches from Earth's Most Vital Frontlines. Profile Books. ISBN 978-1781256374.
- Juniper, Tony (2003). Spix's Macaw: The Race to Save the World's Rarest Bird. Fourth Estate. ISBN 978-1841156514.
- Juniper, Tony (2008). How Many Lightbulbs Does It Take to Change a Planet? 95 Ways to Save Planet Earth. Quercus. ISBN 978-1847243713.
- Juniper, Tony (2007). Saving Planet Earth: What is Destroying the Earth and What You Can Do to Help. Collins. ISBN 978-0007261833.
- Charles, HRH The Prince of Wales; Juniper, Tony; Skelly, Ian (2010). Harmony: A New Way of Looking at Our World. HarperCollins. ISBN 978-0007348039.
- Juniper, Tony (2013). What Has Nature Ever Done for Us? How Money Really Does Grow on Trees. Profile Books. ISBN 978-1846685606.
- Juniper, Tony (2015). What Nature Does for Britain. Profile Books. ISBN 978-1781253281.
- Juniper, Tony (2016). What's Really Happening to Our Planet? The Facts Simply Explained. Foreword by HRH The Prince of Wales. Dorling Kindersley. ISBN 978-1465445476.
- Charles, HRH The Prince of Wales; Juniper, Tony; Shuckburgh, Emily (2017). Climate Change (The Ladybird Expert Series, 1). Illustrated by Palmer, Ruth. Michael Joseph. ISBN 978-0718185855.
- Charles, HRH The Prince of Wales; Juniper, Tony; Shuckburgh, Emily (2019). Climate Change (Penguin Readers Level 3). Abridged ed. Penguin. ISBN 978-0241397862.
- Juniper, Tony (2021). The Science of our Changing Planet: From Global Warming to Sustainable Development. DK. ISBN 978-0241560358.
- Charles III; Juniper, Tony; Shuckburgh, Emily (2023). A Ladybird Book: Climate Change. Illustrated by Nandhra, Aleesha. Ladybird. ISBN 978-0241545669.
- Juniper, Tony (2025). Just Earth: How a Fairer World Will Save the Planet. Bloomsbury Continuum. ISBN 978-1399410700.
