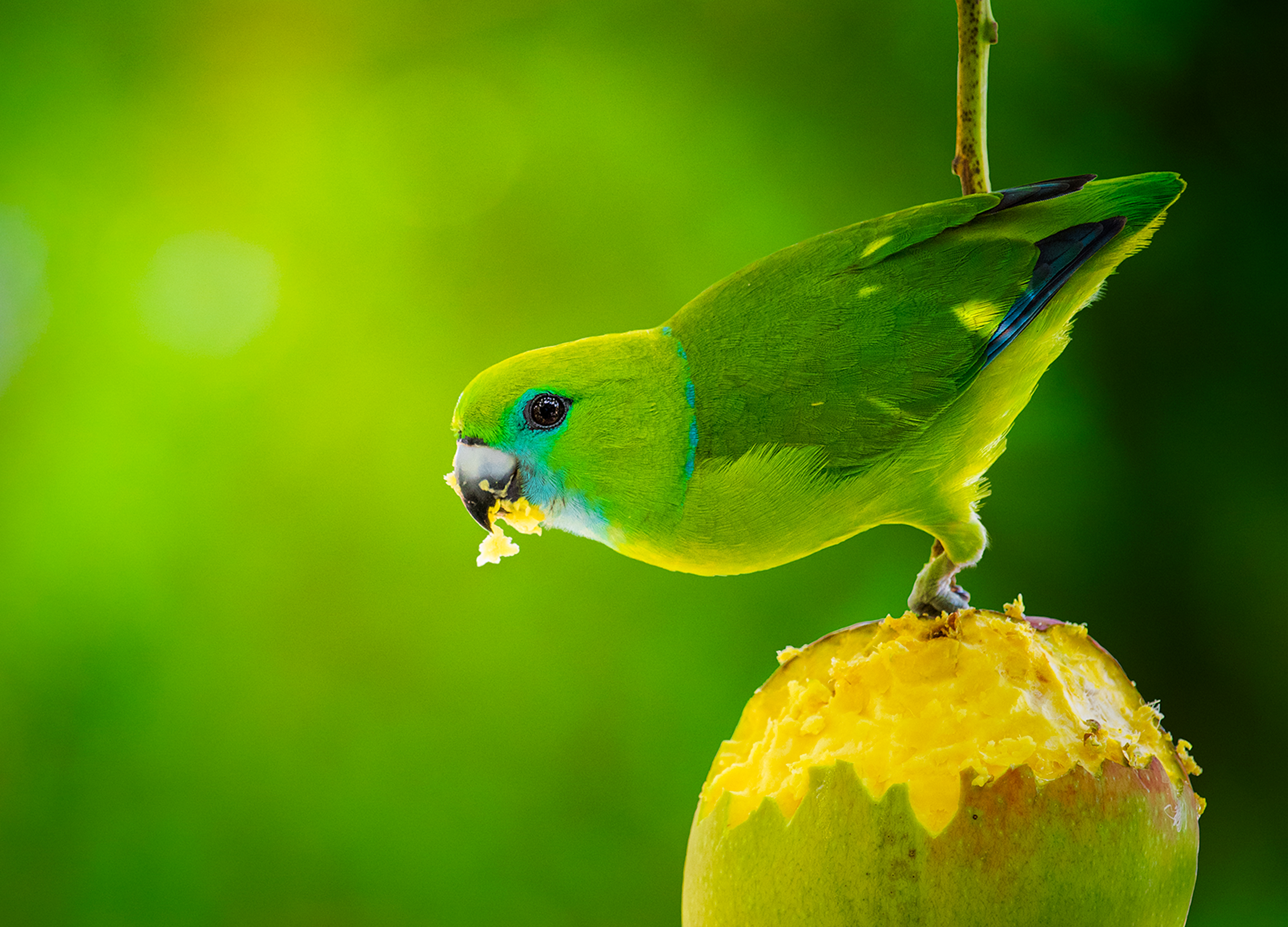

Conservation status
- Least Concern (IUCN 3.1)

Scientific classification
- Kingdom: Animalia
- Phylum: Chordata
- Class: Aves
- Order: Psittaciformes
- Family: Psittaculidae
- Genus: Bolbopsittacus; Salvadori, 1891
- Species: B. lunulatus

Binomial name
- Bolbopsittacus lunulatus (Scopoli, 1786)

= Guaiabero =

Genus of birds

The guaiabero (Bolbopsittacus lunulatus) is a species of parrot in the family Psittaculidae, belonging to the monotypic genus Bolbopsittacus and closely related to the lovebirds and hanging parrots . It is endemic to the Philippines and locally known as bubutok. Its common name is derived from its reputation for eating guavas.

== Description and taxonomy ==
Measuring around 15 cm (5.9 in) in length, it is a smallish, stout parrot with a large bill and stubby tail. The sexes differ in plumage. The adult male is green overall, with more yellowish underparts and a pale blue face and collar and wing primaries. The rump is yellow-green. The bill is grey-blue and with a darker tip, and the eyes dark brown. The adult female is also greenish, with a yellow collar and less blue on the face. It has black crescent markings on the nape and rump. Its bill is paler grey.

The guaiabero was first described as Psittacus lunulatus by Tyrolean naturalist Giovanni Antonio Scopoli in 1786. The only member of its genus, it is distinctive.

=== Subspecies ===
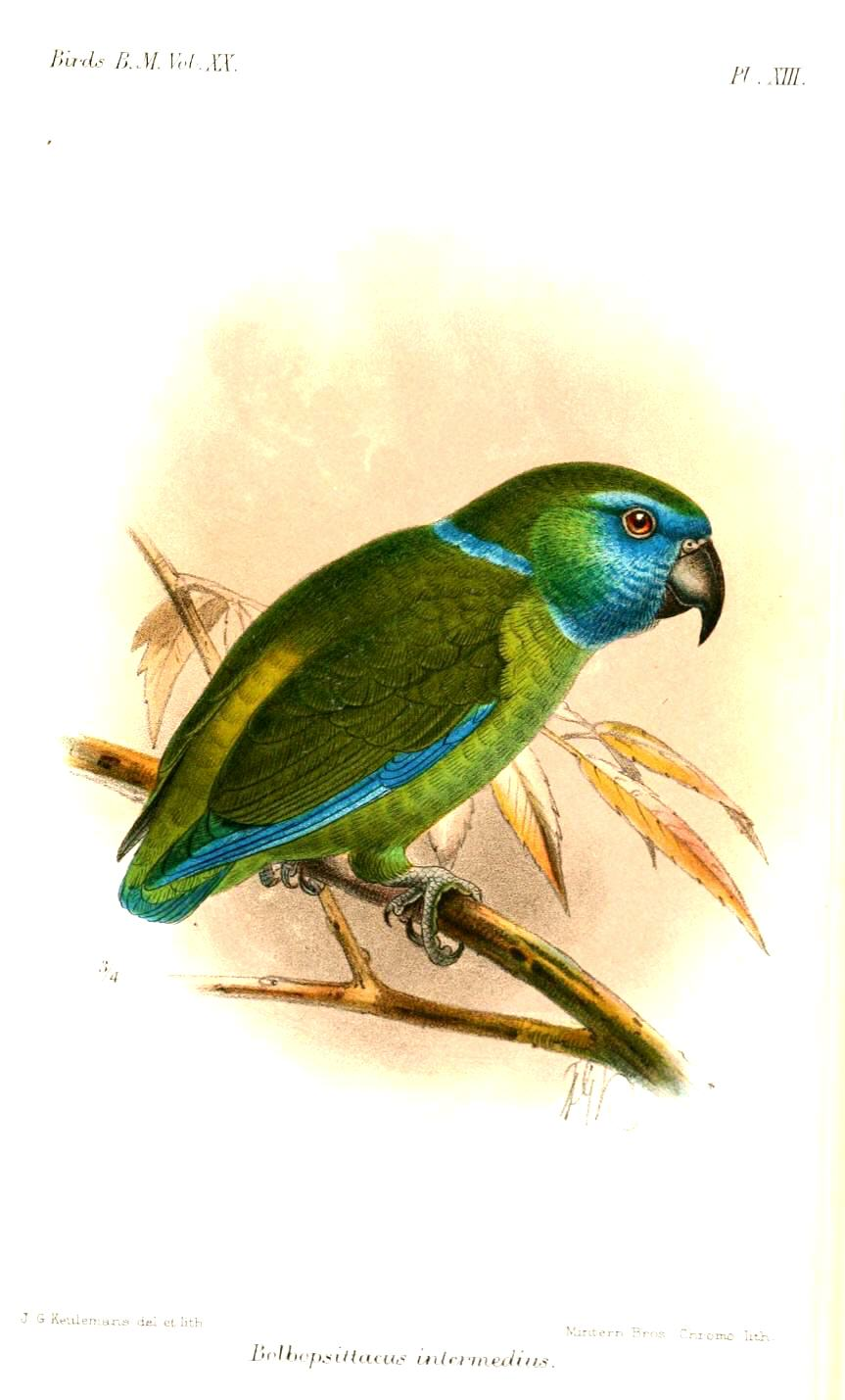
Subspecies B. l. intermedius, illustration by Keulemans, 1891

Four subspecies are recognized:

- B l. lunulatus— Found on Luzon
- B l. intermedius — Found on Leyte and Panaon Island; darker with a more distinctive blue collar and some purple-tinge on the face
- B l. callainipictus — Found on Samar; similar to the Leyte subspecies, but with a more yellow tone overall
- B l.mindanensis — Found on Mindanao; greener cheeks

== Behaviour and ecology ==
It inhabits lowland forests and adjacent cleared country. It is a predominantly fruit eating parrot, and has been recorded near fruit trees such as mangos. Its name was derived from its affinity to guava trees. Has also been recorded feeding on seeds. The breeding habits in the wild remained virtually unknown until a few years ago, but based on recent observations it appears to nest in a self-excavated cavity inside an arboreal ant nest or termitaria.

== Habitat and conservation status ==
It lives in primary or secondary forests, mangroves and plantations with available termite mounds up 1,000 meters above sea level.

The IUCN Red List has assessed this bird as least-concern species as it is common throughout its range and is found throughout the entire Philippines. Its population is still said to be stable as it appears to be tolerant of degraded habitat. However, this species is trapped for the pet trade despite its relatively low survivability in comparison with other parrots.
