= Smallwood Report =

2005 report promoting alternative medicine

The Smallwood Report, officially entitled The Role of Complementary and Alternative Medicine in the NHS: An Investigation into the Potential Contribution of Mainstream Alternative Therapies to Healthcare in the UK, was a 2005 report promoting the use of so-called "alternative medicine" in Britain's taxpayer funded National Health Service, as a cost-effective and efficacious alternative to evidence-based medicine. The report was written by economist Christopher Smallwood, commissioned by Charles, Prince of Wales, and funded by disgraced Tory politician Dame Shirley Porter. The report recommended that a number of treatments be made available on the NHS, including acupuncture, homoeopathy, manipulation therapies and herbal remedies. Graeme Catto wrote the introduction. Smallwood is an economist with no background in healthcare.

== Criticism ==
The report was criticized by alternative medicine academic researcher Edzard Ernst, who wrote that it was inaccurate, misleading and that "its conclusions were written before the authors had searched for evidence that might match them". The editor of The Lancet Richard Horton wrote that the report contained "dangerous nonsense".

As a dire consequence of Ernst's response, Charles' secretary Sir Michael Peat filed a complaint to Exeter University to initiate an investigation file on Ernst for misconduct. Although Ernst was exonerated, his department was disbanded due to stoppage of funding and he was forced into early retirement. The role of Prince Charles' royal office has been scrutinized as a result of the interference.
