= Garden Media Guild =

British trade association

The British Garden Media Guild (formerly The Garden Writers' Guild) is a trade organisation for professional garden writers, journalists, photographers, broadcasters and members of allied trades. The Guild was established in 1991 (35 years ago) to improve the quality of garden writing, photography and broadcasting by improving links between the gardening mass media and the horticultural industry and keeping its members up-to-date with events in the world of gardening and horticulture. The Guild also aims to help its members operate efficiently and profitably and improve liaisons between garden writers, photographers, publishers and more.

== Guild activities ==
The Guild's committee organises Briefing Days, during which the horticultural trade and Guild members are made aware of new developments and exchange views. A regular programme of garden visits gives members exclusive behind-the-scenes access to many UK gardens. Training is provided in key areas of horticultural media and publishing. The Guild publishes a quarterly magazine for members and a monthly e-newsletter. The Guild has held its Awards Lunch, recognizing excellence in horticultural communications, since 1992.

The Professional Garden Photographers' Association (PGPA) is part of the Garden Media Guild. Members of the Guild who are photographers are able to join this Association of more than 100 professional garden photographers from across the UK, Europe, Japan and the USA.
