= Ian Skelly =

British radio presenter

Ian Skelly is a British broadcaster, filmmaker and writer, who is best known as a BBC radio presenter. Born in Manchester, he grew up in West Lancashire and studied at Birmingham City University.

== Broadcasting career ==
Skelly began his broadcasting career in 1981 in Lancashire at the new commercial radio station for the county, Red Rose Radio, and later at BBC Radio Blackburn, now BBC Radio Lancashire, before moving to the BBC in Birmingham where he became a news reporter. He went on to present daily radio shows for the BBC in Leicester, Nottingham, Shrewsbury and Derby with spells as a television reporter in the East Midlands of England, before moving to London in 1993 to join BBC Radio 3. He regularly presents Radio 3 in Concert, the station's evening concert strand, the BBC Proms and has hosted all of the main daytime shows - Breakfast, the Afternoon live music strands and In Tune. In 2018, he became presenter of the morning show Essential Classics. In March 2021 he moved to the afternoon strand to help revamp Afternoon Concert. In April 2024 he returned to the mid morning slot, Essential Classics.

== Writing ==
in 1989 Skelly was named the Observer newspaper's Young Travel Writer of the Year after an article he wrote about the detrimental environmental impact of so-called 'Green Tourism' in Queensland, Australia. He continued to write travel articles for the newspaper for several years after that.

In 2010, Skelly co-authored with Charles, Prince of Wales and Tony Juniper, Harmony: A New Way of Looking at Our World, a comprehensive exploration of the then Prince's ideas and philosophy. In 2026 the book was re-issued with a new foreword written by Skelly and Juniper, by which time Charles had become King Charles III.

In 2024-25 Skelly worked as an advisor on a new film commissioned by Amazon Prime and MGM which was released in January 2026 and made available in 240 territories: Finding Harmony: A King's Vision, which was based on the original book and charted the book's influence in many sectors around the world. Skelly appears in the film several times.
