= A Vision of Britain: A Personal View of Architecture =

1989 book by Charles III, then Prince of Wales

- Author: Charles III
- Language: English
- Subject: Architecture
- Publisher: Doubleday
- Publication date: 21 October 1989
- Media type: Print (Hardcover)
- Pages: 160
- ISBN: 978-0385269032
- OCLC: 19127346

A Vision of Britain: A Personal View of Architecture is a 1989 book written by Charles III, then the Prince of Wales.

== Summary ==
The Prince of Wales gives his views on the buildings in the United Kingdom.

== Documentary ==
Before the book was released, a BBC documentary was made called HRH Prince Of Wales: A Vision Of Britain. In the documentary the Prince visited buildings in the UK including in Birmingham City Centre and gave his views on the buildings.

The book was translated into French in 1990.
