= Stephanie Donaldson =

British garden writer

- Writing career
- Genre: Gardening
- Subject: organic methods
- Notable work: The Elements of Organic Gardening

Stephanie Donaldson is an editor and garden author, specializing in organic methods. Her expertise in organic gardening led to her co-authoring the Prince of Wales’s book The Elements of Organic Gardening – Prince Charles, the Royal Gardener, released by Kales Press in March 2007.

== Biography ==
Donaldson's grandfather introduced her to gardening at age 5, and she went on to become one of the first participants in WWOOF.

== Books ==
She has written 71 books with gardening titles including a book she co-wrote with the Prince of Wales. This book, The Elements of Organic Gardening (2007) include outlining techniques for organic gardening which can be scaled down for any sized garden. The book is illustrated with full-color photographs. Much of her work centers on organic gardening and the New York Times writes that "On the whole the book supports the argument for going organic."

Earlier books, Country Containers (1999) and Dried Flower Gifts: Creating Decorative Arrangements (1995) were well reviewed by Library Journal.

== Other contributions ==
She is the contributing gardens editor of Country Living magazine (appointed April 2000) and writes a garden blog.

Donaldson is a trustee at Gardening for Disabled Trust.
