= Tayburn =

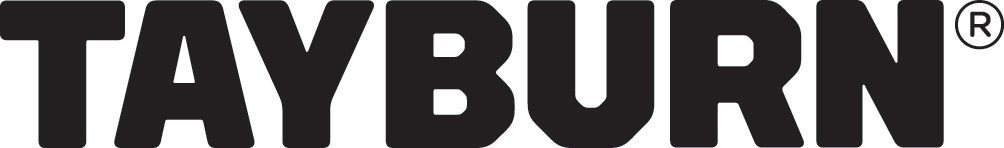
- Type: Agency
- Industry: Branding, design and digital
- Founded: March 5, 1979; 47 years ago
- Founder: Erick Davidson and Andrew Hunter
- Headquarters: Edinburgh, Scotland
- Owner: Simon Farrell, Malcolm Stewart, Steven Mitchell and Bill Davidson
- Website: Company website

Tayburn is a branding, design and digital agency in Scotland. The agency is based in Fountainbridge, Edinburgh, with branches in Glasgow and Istanbul.

== History ==
Tayburn was formed on 5 March 1979 by Erick Davidson and Andrew Hunter. By 1980, Tayburn employed 18 people and began growing a blue chip client book across the UK. In 1981 turnover was £1million and profit £100,000 and offices were opened in London and Aberdeen.

A management buyout led by Erick Davidson in 1988 meant a majority ownership for the executive directors. Tayburn was by this stage established as a respected design consultancy with many creative awards to its name. During the 1980s their clients included BP, Bank of Scotland, B&Q and the Scottish Development Agency. The latter was rebranded by Tayburn to become Scottish Enterprise, and they also handled the privatisation of Scottish Electricity for Scottish Hydro-Electric, who, as SSE plc, are still a client today. Tayburn was also the inaugural winner of The Scottish Design Consultancy of the Year Award in 1992.

During the mid-1990s Tayburn became the only ever Scotland-based winner of Best Annual Report prize from the Stock Exchange for Grampian Holdings. They were also listed in the UK's Top Ten Design Consultancies for the first time.

By the late 1990s Tayburn had more business from outside Scotland than within it, which led to the establishment of their first international office in Istanbul.

At the turn of the century, Tayburn was awarded 'Design Company of the Decade' by Trade magazine 'The Drum'. In 2006, Simon Farrell joined Tayburn as Managing Director and Erick Davidson became Chairman. Tayburn announced the launch of a new Manchester office and beat entries from other Scottish design consultancies to develop the brand for the 2014 Commonwealth Games bid.

Towards the end of the decade, Tayburn had another management buy-out with Simon Farrell, Malcolm Stewart, Steven Mitchell and Bill Davidson taking over the reins. This change in ownership saw a re-focus on core design specialisms, with equal emphasis on strategically effective design and creativity.

Tayburn went on to develop some significant new business within RBS working with their Formula One sponsorship, managing the re-brand of their Global Banking and Markets division and introducing an internal group-wide Corporate Responsibility campaign.

Towards the end of the decade, Tayburn was appointed to the Scottish Government roster, Scotland's largest creative account. They also developed new business with Diageo, Chewits and Standard Life, and won a DBA gold for design effectiveness with Nairn's. They were also the only agency in 2008 to be recognised with a gold for effectiveness as well as a gold for creativity (Roses). This was repeated in 2009 – albeit with a Marketing Society Star Award and a Scottish Design Award.

In 2010, the consultancy won five gongs at the Scottish Design Awards, including the Grand Prix. In 2011 Tayburn was titled Design agency of the year and received eighteen awards in total for creativity and effectiveness.

Erick Davidson retired as chairman on 30 September 2014.
