= Katala Foundation =

Non-governmental organization

Katala Foundation, Inc. (KF) is a non-profit, non-stock and non-governmental organization that is active in protecting and conserving wildlife, particularly the critically endangered Philippine cockatoo or red-vented cockatoo (scientific name: Cacatua haematuropygia, local name: Katala) and other threatened endemic wildlife in the Philippines. It implements the Philippine Cockatoo Conservation Program (PCCP) with target sites in the island of Palawan, the stronghold of the species. As of 2020, 75% of the Philippine cockatoo's global population can be found within its sites. It considers the Philippine cockatoo as its flagship species but employs an ecosystemic and participatory approach for conservation where people are given important roles in the entirety of the program implementation. Among the activities of the PCCP are nest protection, livelihood, habitat protection and restoration and conservation education.

Katala Foundation implements in close partnership with Loro Parque Fundación and other partners: Zoological Gardens of Chester, Conservation des Espèces et des Populations Animales (CEPA) and Zoologische Gesellschaft für Arten- und Populationsschutz e.V. (ZGAP).

The foundation also work on the study and protection of the endemic Philippine porcupine Hystrix pumila. They were also able to hatch an egg of the Palawan forest turtle, Siebenrockiella leytensis. The turtle is critically endangered due to illegal wildlife trade.

== See also ==
- Birds International
