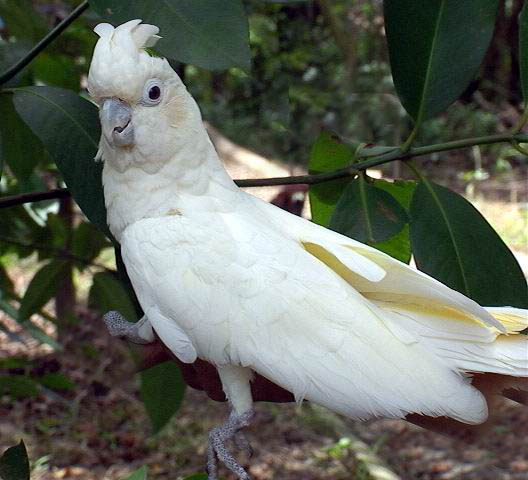
- In Palawan, Philippines
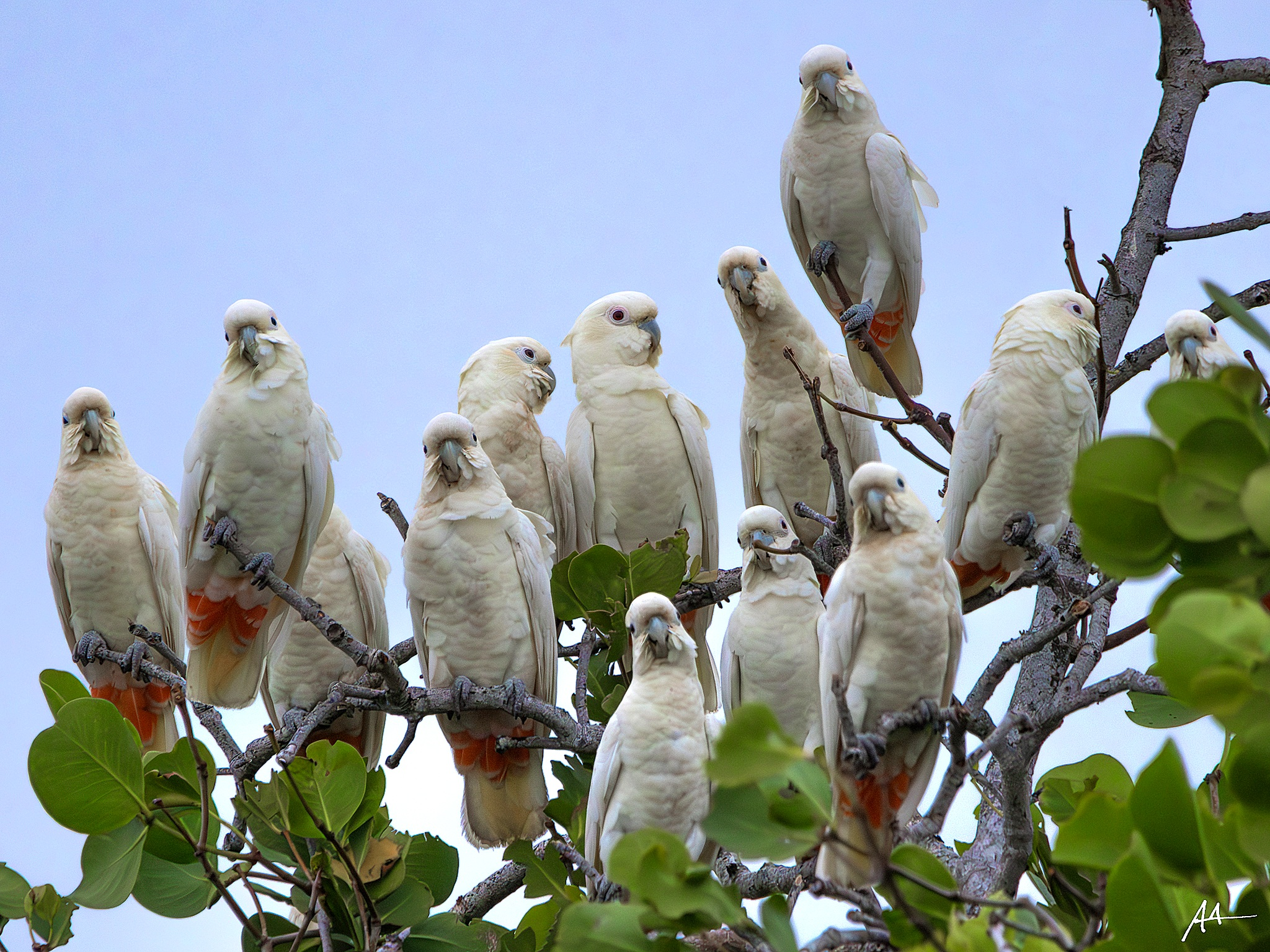
- A flock of wild birds in Palawan

Conservation status
- Critically Endangered (IUCN 3.1)
- CITES Appendix I

Scientific classification
- Kingdom: Animalia
- Phylum: Chordata
- Class: Aves
- Order: Psittaciformes
- Family: Cacatuidae
- Genus: Cacatua
- Subgenus: Licmetis
- Species: C. haematuropygia

Binomial name
- Cacatua haematuropygia (P.L.S. Müller, 1776)

= Red-vented cockatoo =

Species of bird

The red-vented cockatoo (Cacatua haematuropygia), also known as the Philippine cockatoo and locally katala, abukay, agay, or kalangay, is a species of cockatoo. It is endemic to the Philippines, formerly found throughout the entire country, but due to the illegal wildlife trade, it is now locally extinct in most of its range with the only sizeable population remaining in Palawan and Sulu Archipelago. Remnant populations occur in the Polillo Islands, Bohol, and Samar. It is roughly the size and shape of the Tanimbar corella, but is easily distinguished by the red feathers around the vent. It is threatened by habitat loss and the cage-bird trade.

== Description and taxonomy ==
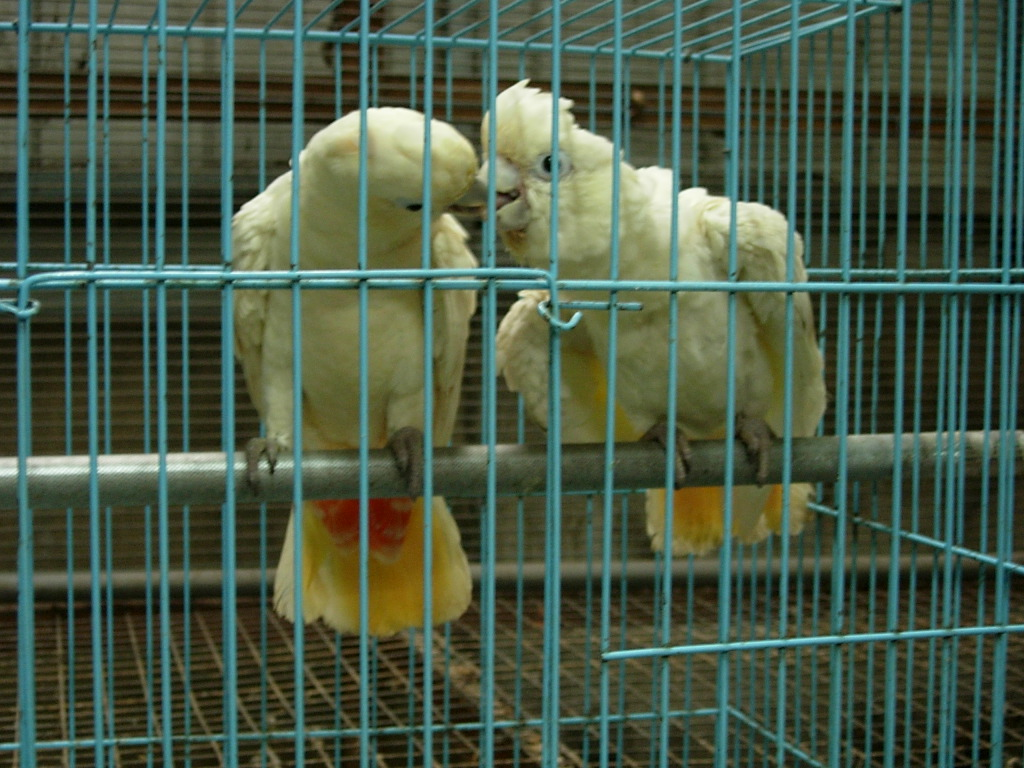
Two in captivity from the illegal wildlife trade

Their plumage is all white with red undertail coverts tipped white, yellowish undertail, and pale-yellow underwings. They average 12 in (30 cm) long and have an 8.6 in (22 cm) wingspan.

The red-vented cockatoo makes a characteristic bleating call, as well as screeching or whistling noises that are common to most cockatoos. It is quieter than most cockatoos, and much quieter than the white cockatoo or salmon-crested cockatoo.

== Behaviour and ecology ==
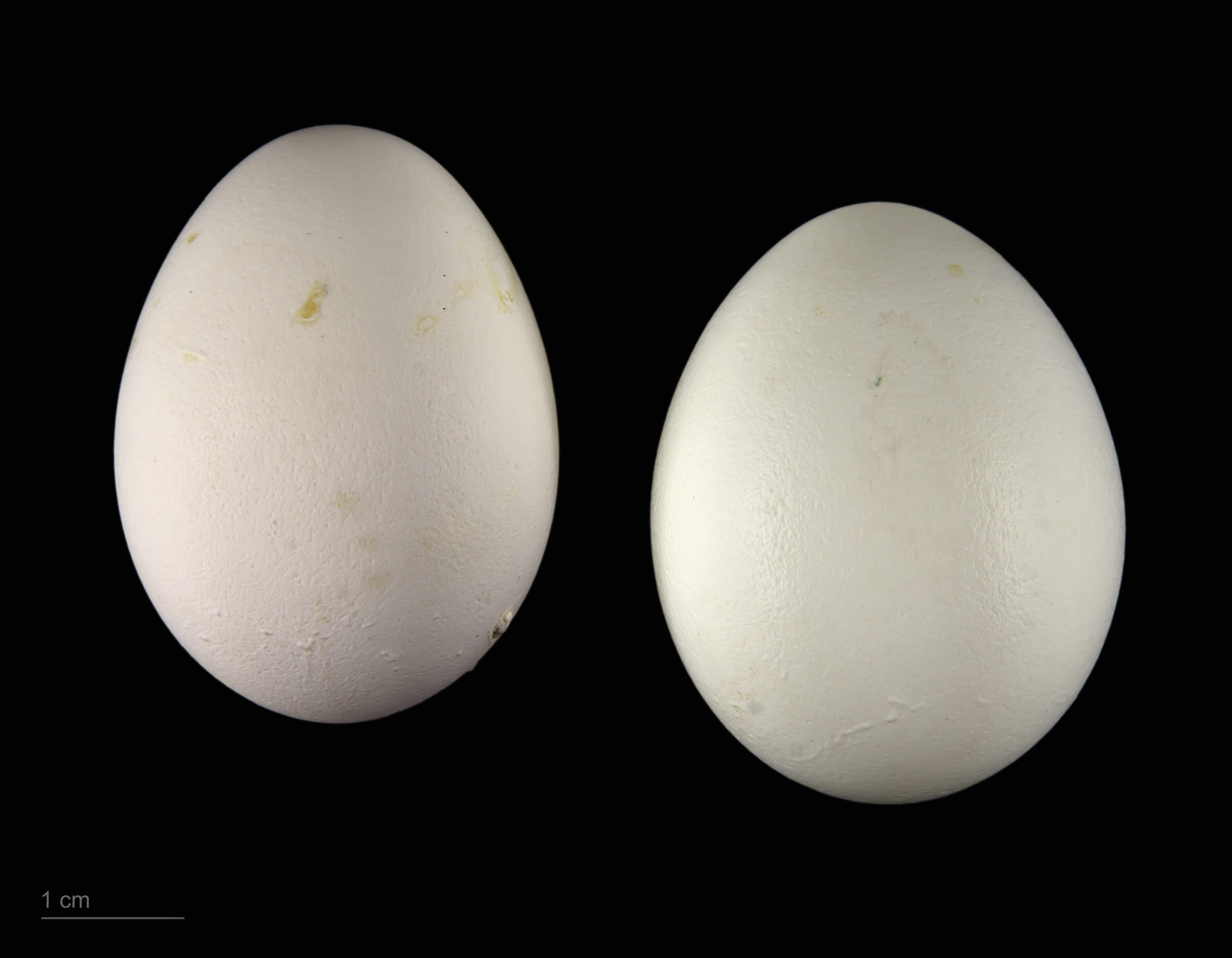
Two Philippine cockatoo eggs- MHNT

The diet of red-vented cockatoos is mostly seeds, but they also eat fruit, flowers, and nectar. They even eat rice and corn, which is why they are considered pests.

Nests are in tree cavities, mainly from February to June. Based on captive breeding, their clutch size is two or three white eggs. Incubation takes 28 days, and hatchlings remain in the nest for 9 to 10 weeks.

Small flock of Red-vented Cockatoo. November 2025, Puerto Princesa City, Palawan.

== Habitat and conservation status ==
It appears to be restricted to lowland primary and/or secondary forest predominantly below 50 m, in or adjacent to riverine or coastal areas with mangroves.

The IUCN Red List has assessed this bird as critically endangered with an estimate of 430 - 750 mature individuals. Red-vented cockatoos were formerly widely distributed on all larger and many smaller islands of the Philippines, excluding northern and central Luzon. In the early 1990s, the total wild population was estimated at 1000–4000, but by 2008, this was reduced to probably less than 1000. Remnant populations exist on the islands of Palawan, Tawitawi, Bohol, and Samar. The species' stronghold is the Palawan Faunal Region, where the Katala Foundation has been running the Philippine Cockatoo Conservation Programme since 1998. Around 180 are found in wilderness conservation in the municipality of Narra and Puerto Princesa, Palawan, particularly in Rasa Island. The efforts for conservation of the Katala Foundation are threatened by plans to build a coal-fired power station on Palawan's coast. Environmental organizations such as the Katala Foundation or Rainforest Rescue are trying to prevent the construction.

Populations have decreased dramatically due to illegal trapping for the cage-bird trade. The high-price fetched per bird (around US$300 in Manila in 2006) means that chicks are taken from virtually every accessible nest. Other contributing factors are loss of coastal habitat and persecution as an agricultural pest. In 1992, an international captive-breeding program was initiated, with 39 birds kept under the European Studbook in 2007. It is also threatened by habitat loss; deforestation still continues due to both legal and illegal logging, conversion into farmland, mining, and road and urban development. In its stronghold on Rasa Island, it is threatened by climate change and extreme weather in which droughts caused up to 60% nest fatality.

Thanks to the efforts of the Katala Foundation, the population has increased in key sites from 23 in 1998 to 260-340 individuals by end of 2015. Individuals have reportedly self-introduced from Rasa Island to the mainland, indicating that Rasa may be reaching carrying capacity. With the implementation of a nest-protection scheme on Pandanan in 2008, the cockatoo population increased from 40 birds to at least 230 by the end of 2015. Despite these massive efforts, the cockatoo population is still believed to be decreasing overall with the many threats affecting other sites.

Currently, sites are assessed and tested for their suitability for translocation. An attempt on a resort island in northern Palawan indicated that rescued hand-raised birds can adapt well to natural conditions, including foraging and predator avoidance, but was terminated owing to problems caused by tameness. Siargao is being assessed and made suitable for reintroduction efforts.

== See also ==
- Katala Foundation, Inc.
