= 2018 Birthday Honours =

Award of British honours

The 2018 Queen's Birthday Honours are appointments by some of the 16 Commonwealth realms of Queen Elizabeth II to various orders and honours to reward and highlight good works by citizens of those countries. The Birthday Honours are awarded as part of the Queen's Official Birthday celebrations during the month of June. The Queen's Birthday Honours for the United Kingdom were announced on 9 June; the honours for New Zealand were announced on 4 June and for Australia on 11 June.

The recipients of honours are displayed as they were styled before their new honour. They are arranged by the country (in order of precedence) whose ministers advised the Queen on the appointments, then by honour with grades, i.e. Knight/Dame Grand Cross, Knight/Dame Commander etc., and then by divisions, i.e. Civil, Diplomatic and Military as appropriate.

== United Kingdom ==
Below are the individuals appointed by Elizabeth II in her right as Queen of the United Kingdom with honours within her own gift, and with the advice of the Government for other honours.

=== Order of the Thistle ===
==== Knight of the Order of the Thistle (KT) ====
- Sir Ian Wood, GBE

=== Order of the Companions of Honour ===
==== Member of the Order of Companions of Honour (CH) ====
- Richard Henderson – Molecular Biologist and Biophysicist, Medical Research Council Laboratory of Molecular Biology. For services to Electron Microscopy of Biological Molecules
- Dame Kiri Te Kanawa, ONZ, DBE, AC – Soprano. For services to Music.

=== Knight Bachelor ===
- Professor Steven Charles Cowley, FRS, FREng, President, Corpus Christi College, University of Oxford. For services to Science and to the Development of Nuclear Fusion.
- Kenneth Dalglish, MBE. For services to Football, charity and the City of Liverpool.
- Professor Christopher Martin Dobson, FRS, Professor of Chemical and Structural Biology and Master, St John's College, Cambridge. For services to Science and Higher Education.
- Lloyd Dorfman, CBE, Philanthropist. For services to Philanthropy and the Arts.
- James Raymond Eadie, QC, First Treasury Council. For services to the Law and to Government.
- Professor Leslie Colin Ebdon, CBE, DL, Lately Director, Fair Access to Higher Education. For services to Higher Education and Social Mobility.
- Douglas Jardine Flint, CBE. For services to the Finance Industry.
- David John Mark Green, CB, QC, Lately Director, Serious Fraud Office. For services to the Criminal Justice System.
- Professor Christopher John Ham, CBE, Lately Chief Executive, The King's Fund. For services to Health Policy and Management.
- Professor David Antony Haslam, CBE, Chair, National Institute for Health and Care Excellence. For services to NHS Leadership.
- Ben Helfgott, MBE. For services to Holocaust Remembrance and Education.
- Professor James Hough, OBE, FRS, FRSE, Associate Director, Institute for Gravitational Research, University of Glasgow. For services to the Detection of Gravitational Waves.
- Professor Christopher Roy Husbands, Vice-Chancellor, Sheffield Hallam University. For services to Higher Education.
- Kazuo Ishiguro, OBE, FRSA, Author. For services to Literature.
- The Honourable Bernard Christison Jenkin, MP, Member of Parliament for Harwich and North Essex. For political and public service.
- Simon John Keenlyside, CBE, Baritone. For services to Music.
- James Arthur Ratcliffe, Chairman and Chief Executive, Ineos Chemical Group. For services to Business and Investment.
- Mark Peter Rowley, QPM, Lately Assistant Commissioner, Metropolitan Police Service. For services to Policing.
- Dr. Charles Saumarez Smith, CBE, FBA, Secretary and Chief Executive, Royal Academy of Arts. For services to Art, Architecture and Culture in the UK.
- Simon Michael Schama, CBE, FBA, Historian and Broadcaster. For services to History.
- Tim Waterstone, Founder, Waterstones. For services to Bookselling and charity.

==== Diplomatic and overseas list ====
- Professor Paul Preston, CBE. For services to UK/Spain relations.
- Geoffrey Alan Tantum, CMG, OBE. For services to British interests overseas.

=== Order of the Bath ===
==== Knight/Dame Commander of the Order of the Bath (KCB/DCB) ====
===== Civil =====
- Susan Jane Owen, CB – Permanent Secretary, Department for Digital, Culture, Media and Sport and Civil Service Champion for Diversity and Inclusion. For public service.
- David Natzler – Clerk of the House of Commons. For Parliamentary Service.

===== Military =====
- Lieutenant General Tom Beckett, CBE
- Lieutenant General Mark Poffley, OBE

==== Companion of the Order of the Bath (CB) ====
===== Civil =====
- Lucy Victoria Annabel Chadwick – Lately Director General of International Security and Environment, Department for Transport. For public service.
- Matthew Coffey – Chief Operating Officer, Ofsted. For services to Education.
- Michael Brian Driver – Chief Financial Officer, Ministry of Justice and Head of Government Finance, HM Treasury. For public service.
- Karen Elizabeth Gosden, OBE – Universal Credit Area Director, Department for Work and Pensions. For services to Welfare Reform.
- George Thomas Alexander Gray – Lately Head, Office of the Legislative Counsel, Northern Ireland. For services to Legislation and Constitutional Law.
- Lowri Alice Khan, CBE – Director, Financial Stability, HM Treasury. For public service.
- Professor John Loughhead, OBE – Chief Scientific Adviser, Department for Business, Energy and Industrial Strategy. For services to Research and Development in the Energy Sector.
- Hayley Rogers – Parliamentary Counsel, Office of the Parliamentary Counsel. For services to the Preparation of Legislation.

===== Military =====
- Rear Admiral Nicholas Hine
- Major General Robert Magowan, CBE
- Vice Admiral Antony David Radakin
- Lieutenant General James Bashall, CBE
- Major General James Chiswell, CBE, MC
- Major General Ivan Bartholomew Leonard Jones
- Air Vice-Marshal Anthony Sean Corbett, MBE
- Air Vice-Marshal Graham Michael Russell

=== Order of St Michael and St George ===
==== Knight/Dame Commander of the Order of St Michael and St George (KCMG/DCMG) ====
- David Urquhart – For services to international relations.
- Rob Wainwright – For services to policing and to security.
- Karen Pierce, CMG – For services to British foreign policy.

==== Companion of the Order of St Michael and St George (CMG) ====
- Adolfo Canepa, OBE – For services to Gibraltar
- Jill Gallard – For services to the Foreign and Commonwealth Office.
- Judith Gough – For services to British foreign policy.
- Peter Edward Jones – For services to British foreign and security policy.
- Martin Alexander Baillie Reynolds – For services to British foreign policy.

=== Royal Victorian Order ===
==== Knight Grand Cross of the Royal Victorian Order (GCVO) ====
- Sir Stephen Lamport, GCVO. Receiver-General, Westminster Abbey.

==== Knight Commander of the Royal Victorian Order (KCVO) ====
- Tim Hitchens, CMG, LVO. Formerly Chief Executive, Commonwealth Summit Unit, Foreign and Commonwealth Office.
- Brigadier Melville Stewart Jameson, CBE. Lord-Lieutenant of Perth and Kinross.
- Major General Martin White, CB, CBE. Lord-Lieutenant of the Isle of Wight.

==== Commander of the Royal Victorian Order (CVO) ====
- Meriel Rose Afia, LVO. Lady in Waiting to Princess Alexandra, the Honourable Lady Ogilvy.
- Janet Margaret Bowen. Lord-Lieutenant of Ross and Cromarty.
- David Ellis Brownlow, DL. Formerly Chairman, The Prince's Foundation for Building Community.
- Helen Andrea Louise Cross, LVO. The Queen's Diary Secretary, Royal Household.
- Dame Amelia Chilcott Fawcett, DBE. Formerly Chairman, The Prince of Wales's Charitable Foundation.
- Sir Gregory David Green, KCMG. Chairman, The Prince's School of Traditional Arts.
- Sir Brian Gammell Ivory, CBE. Formerly Chairman of Dumfries House Trust.
- Jonathan David Jagger, LVO. Surgeon-Oculist to The Queen.
- Lieutenant Colonel Grenville Johnston, OBE, TD. Lord-Lieutenant of Moray.
- Mary, The Lady Nicholas Gordon Lennox, LVO. Lady in Waiting to Princess Alexandra, the Honourable Lady Ogilvy.

==== Lieutenant of the Royal Victorian Order (LVO) ====
- Satyajit Bhattacharya, Serjeant-Surgeon to the Royal Household.
- Patricia Curtis, MVO. Senior Honours and Investiture Clerk, Central Chancery of the Orders of Knighthood.
- Hannah Margaret Louise Howard, Assistant Communications Secretary, Royal Household.
- John Brian Pickett, MVO. Chief Executive, The Duke of Edinburgh's Commonwealth Study Conferences (Australia).
- Colonel Timothy Corran Richard Brooke Purdon, OBE. Formerly Lieutenant of the Honourable Corps of Gentlemen at Arms.
- Kevin Arthur Sharp, Clerk to the West Yorkshire Lieutenancy.
- Mary Margaret Thomson, Formerly Chairman, Outward Bound International.

==== Member of the Royal Victorian Order (MVO) ====
- Panorea Alexandratos. Cassiano Dal Pozzo Project Co-ordinator, Royal Collection Trust.
- Laura Baker. Assistant Private Secretary to The Duke of Cambridge.
- David William Black. Property Information Manager, Royal Household.
- Michael Andrew Davies, Household of The Duke of York.
- Gary David Ganley, RVM. Carpet Planner, Windsor Castle.
- Debbie Maxine Reich Goodenough. Head Gardener, Highgrove Estate.
- Charlotte Jane Ingle. Executive Assistant to the Private Secretary to The Duke of Cambridge.
- Paul Roger Ludwig, Formerly The Queen's Bargemaster.
- Christopher John Morton, Chief Yeoman Warder, H.M. Tower of London.
- Cecily Ann Pearson, OAM. Formerly Deputy Official Secretary to the Governor of Queensland.
- Major Harry Joe Pilcher. Equerry to The Prince of Wales.
- Commander Anne Gillian Sullivan. Assistant Private Secretary to The Princess Royal.
- Martin Swift. Formerly Crown Jeweller.
- Sarah Elizabeth Townend. Deputy Secretary, Master of the Household's Department.
- Julie Townsend. Personal Assistant to the Legal and Records Team, Duchy of Lancaster.
- Jane Whaley. Domestic Bursar, Cumberland Lodge.
- Helen Wiffen. Formerly Deputy Official Secretary to the Administrator of the Northern Territory.

=== Royal Victorian Medal (RVM) ===
==== Silver ====
- George Brodie, BEM. Formerly Yeoman Serjeant, HM Tower of London.
- Philip James Chatwin. Keeper of the Closet, Her Majesty's Chapels Royal, St James's Palace.
- Philip Fernie. Deputy Head Stalker, Balmoral Estate.
- Michael Anthony Fyfe. Joiner, Balmoral Estate.
- Paul Michael Goodall. Fire Safety and Access Control Officer, Buckingham Palace.
- Michelle Ann Maynard. Groom, The Duke of Edinburgh's Driving Team.
- Stephen Colin Meen. Horticulturist, Crown Estate, Windsor.
- Sarah Jane Penney. Cook, Government House, Guernsey.
- Matthew John Powers. Coaching Instructor, Royal Mews, Royal Household.
- Allen James Shuttlewood. Team Leader, Crown Estate, Windsor.
- Philippus Louwrens Steenkamp. Household of The Duke of York.

=== Order of the British Empire ===
==== Knight Grand Cross of the Order of the British Empire (GBE) ====
- Sir Craig Reedie, CBE, President, World Anti-Doping Agency. For services to Sport.
- Sir Christopher Greenwood, CMG, QC. For services to international justice.

==== Knight/Dame Commander of the Order of the British Empire (KBE/DBE) ====
- David William Kinloch Anderson, QC. Lately Independent Reviewer of Terrorism Legislation. For services to National Security and Civil Liberties.
- Professor Winifred Mary Beard, OBE. Professor of Classics, University of Cambridge. For services to the Study of Classical Civilisation.
- Professor Jane Elizabeth Dacre. President, The Royal College of Physicians. For services to Medicine and Medical Education.
- Louise Joyce Ellman, MP. Member of Parliament for Liverpool Riverside. For Parliamentary and Political Services.
- Moya Marguerite Greene. Chief Executive, Royal Mail plc. For services to Business and the Postal Sector.
- Professor Susan Lesley Hill, OBE. Chief Scientific Officer, NHS England. For services to the 100,000 Genome Project and to NHS Genomic Medicine.
- The Right Honourable Eleanor Fulton Laing, MP. Member of Parliament for Epping Forest. For political and public service.
- Stella Gordon Manzie, CBE. Interim Chief Executive, Birmingham City Council. For services to Local Government.
- Professor Angela Ruth McLean, FRS. Professor of Mathematical Biology, University of Oxford. For services to Mathematical Biology and Scientific Advice for Government.
- Dr Frances Carolyn Saunders, CB. For services to Science and Engineering.
- Emma Thompson. Actress. For services to Drama.
- Janet Mary Vitmayer, CBE. Lately Chief Executive and Director, Horniman Museum. For services to Museums and Diversity.
- Reverend Dr Ralph Waller. Lately Principal, Harris Manchester College, University of Oxford, and Pro Vice-Chancellor, University of Oxford. For services to Education.

==== Commander of the Order of the British Empire (CBE) ====
Military

- Captain Michael Bruce Knott, RN.
- Colonel Michael Edward George Caldicott, MBE.
- Colonel John Etherington, OBE.
- Brigadier Simon Peter Hamilton, OBE.
- Acting Brigadier Michael Robert Keating.
- Colonel Francis Alexander James Piggott, OBE.
- Group Captain Andrew David Green.
- Air Commodore Richard Hill.

Civil

- Dr Thomas Ades. Composer, Pianist and Conductor. For services to Music.
- Kathryn Adie, OBE. Journalist and Radio Presenter. For services to Media.
- Professor Bashir Mohammed Ali Al-Hashimi. Professor of Computer Engineering, University of Southampton. For services to Computer Engineering and Industry.
- Barbara Pettigrew. Allison Director, Communications, Ministerial Support and Facilities, Scottish Government. For public service.
- Robert John Ayling. Lately Chairman of the Board, HM Courts and Tribunals Service. For public service.
- Professor Jaswinder Singh Bamrah. Consultant Psychiatrist, Greater Manchester Mental Health NHS Trust and Honorary Reader, University of Manchester. For services to Mental Health, Diversity and the NHS.
- Alexander Hugh McCormack Begbie. Chief People Officer, Standard Life. For services to Business and Social Inclusion.
- Caroline Brazier. Chief Librarian, British Library. For services to Librarianship and Higher Education.
- Professor Christoffel Hendrik Brink. Emeritus Vice-Chancellor, Newcastle University. For services to Higher Education.
- Stanley Robert Brown. Chief Executive, Forensic Science Northern Ireland. For services to Science and Justice.
- Professor Julia Clare Buckingham, Vice-Chancellor and President, Brunel Mrs Smith University, London. For services to Biology and Education.
- Elizabeth Nicole Calder. Co-founder, Bloomsbury Publishing. For services to Literature.
- Ryan Jerome Campbell. Chair, Mind. For services to Improving Mental Health Provision in England and Wales.
- Mark Milford Power Carne. Chief Executive, Network Rail. For services to the Rail Industry.
- Dr Margaret Henrietta Augusta Casely-Hayford. For charitable services in the UK and Abroad.
- Dinah Victoria Casson. Co-founder, Casson Mann. For services to Design.
- Brent Cheshire. Lately Chairman, DONG Energy UK Ltd. For services to the Renewable Energy Sector.
- Naomi Wendy Climer. For services to the Engineering Profession.
- Yvonne Veronica Coghill, OBE. Director, Workforce Race Equality Standard Implementation, NHS England. For services to Race Equality in the NHS.
- Dionne Collins, QPM. Chief Constable, West Yorkshire Police. For services to Policing and the British Association of Women in Policing.
- Timothy Douglas Davie. Chief Executive Officer, BBC Studios. For services to International Trade.
- Professor Rosemary Genevieve Davis. Professor Emeritus, University College London, Institute of Education. For services to Education.
- Professor Lorna Anne Dawson. Principal Soil Scientist, The James Hutton Institute. For services to Soil and Forensic Science.
- William Hood Dodds. Head, Building Standards, Scottish Government. For public service.
- Peter Dwyer. Lately Director, Children and Young People's Services, North Yorkshire County Council. For services to Children's Social Work.
- Dr Alison Janet Elliot, OBE. Lately Associate Director, Centre for Theology and Public Issues, University of Edinburgh. For public service.
- Richard Peter Elsy. Chief Executive, High Value Manufacturing Catapult. For services to Manufacturing and Technology.
- Dr Hilary Frances Emery. Honorary Norham Fellow, University of Oxford and lately Chief Executive, National Children's Bureau. For services to Children and Young People.
- Alun Trevor Bernard Evans. Chief Executive and Secretary, The British Academy. For services to Scholarship.
- David Eyton. Group Head of Technology, BP plc. For services to Engineering and Energy.
- Kenneth Martin Follett. Author. For services to Literature and charity.
- Marie Sylvia Gabriel. Chair, East London NHS Foundation Trust. For services to the NHS.
- Arthur Bamber Gascoigne. Broadcaster and Writer. For services to the Arts.
- Dr Robert Nicolas Gent. Consultant, Health Protection and Deputy Head, Emergency Response Department, Public Health England. For services to Health Protection.
- Professor George Edward Griffin. Emeritus Professor, Infectious Diseases and Medicine, St George's, University of London. For services to Public Health and Health Research.
- Rosamund Clare Hamilton. Director, North West, National Probation Service. For services to Probation and Criminal Justice.
- Edward Thomas Hardy. Actor. For services to Drama.
- Professor Sarah Harper. Director, Oxford Institute of Population Ageing, University of Oxford. For services to Science of Demography.
- Professor Jonathan Edward Haskel. Professor of Economics, Imperial College London. For services to Economics.
- David Wilson Havelock. Lately Director, Credit Risk Group, UK Export Finance, Department for International Trade. For services to the Economy.
- Professor Ann Louise Heathwaite. Professor, Land and Water Science, Lancaster Environment Centre. For services to Scientific Research and Scientific Advice to Government.
- Dr Colin Herron. Managing Director, Zero Carbon Futures. For services to Business and the Renewable Energy Sector.
- Professor Carole Hillenbrand, OBE. Emerita Professor, Islamic History, University of Edinburgh and Professor, University of St Andrews. For services to the Understanding of Islamic History.
- Lubaina Himid, MBE. Artist. For services to Art.
- Professor Matthew Hugo Hotopf. Vice Dean of Research, Institute of Psychiatry, Psychology and Neuroscience, King's College London. For services to Psychiatric Research.
- Nicholas Houghton. Deputy Director, International Tax Policy and Structure, HM Revenue and Customs. For services to International Tax Development and Promoting Overseas Investment in the UK.
- Janice Hughes. Co-founder and Director, Redshift Strategy. For services to UK Technology Exports, charitable services to Healthcare Abroad and the Global Telecom Women's Network.
- Professor Jill (Billie) Hunter. Professor of Midwifery, Cardiff University. For services to Midwifery and Midwifery Education in the UK and Europe.
- Professor Graham John Hutchings, FRS. Regius Professor of Chemistry, Cardiff University and Director, Cardiff Catalysis Institute. For services to Chemistry and Innovation.
- Thomas Segun Ilube. Entrepreneur. For services to Technology and Philanthropy.
- Paul Gavin Johnson. Director, Institute for Fiscal Studies. For services to the Social Sciences and Economics.
- David Kinder. Alternate Executive Director for the UK, World Bank Group. For public service and services to Mental Wellbeing.
- Kanya King, MBE. Entrepreneur. For services to Music and Culture.
- Dr John Kirkby. Founder, Christians Against Poverty. For services to Poverty Relief.
- Professor Jane Alison Langdale, FRS. Professorial Research Fellow, Department of Plant Sciences, The Queen's College, University of Oxford. For services to Plant Science.
- Dr Paul Litchfield, OBE. Chief Medical Officer, BT Group plc. For services to Wellbeing in the Workplace.
- Brendan Joseph Mcguigan. For services to Justice in Northern Ireland.
- Professor Robert Edward Moon. For services to Education in Developing Countries.
- Gillian Moore, MBE. Director of Music, Southbank Centre. For services to Music.
- Heidi Mottram, OBE. Chief Executive Officer, Northumbrian Water Group. For services to the Water Industry and Business Community.
- Professor James Murdoch. Professor of Public Law, University of Glasgow. For services to Education and Human Rights.
- Kevin Patrick O'Hare. Director, The Royal Ballet. For services to Dance.
- David Campbell Orr. Chief Executive, National Housing Federation. For services to Housing.
- Ian David Prosser. Director of Railway Safety, Office of Rail and Road. For services to Railway Safety.
- Dr Ethel Quayle. Reader in Clinical Psychology, COPINE Research Project, University of Edinburgh. For services to the Online Welfare of Children and Young People.
- Timothy William Read. Universal Credit Delivery Manager, Business Transformation Group, Department for Work and Pensions. For services to Welfare Reform.
- Professor Stuart William John Reid. Principal, Royal Veterinary College. For services to the Veterinary Profession and Higher Education.
- Richard George Riley. Director, Home Office. For services to National Security.
- Jayne Ripley. Senior Management, Ministry of Defence. For services to Defence.
- The Honourable Hannah Mary Rothschild. Writer and filmmaker. For services to the Arts and charity.
- Jonathan Mark (Jon) Rouse. Chief Officer, Greater Manchester Health and Social Care Partnership. For services to Health and Social Care.
- Mark Francis Russell. Chief Executive, UK Government Investments. For services to Business and the Economy.
- Jennifer Margaret Saunders, OBE. Lately Chief Executive, National Energy Action. For services to Tackling Fuel Poverty.
- Robert Lee Shaw. Deputy Chief Executive, NHS Digital. For services to Health and Social Care.
- Professor Janice Debra Sigsworth. Executive Director of Nursing, Imperial College Healthcare Trust. For services to Nursing.
- Patricia Mary Smart. Chief Executive Officer, Create Partnership Trust. For services to Education.
- Professor Robert Steele. Senior Research Professor, Prevention, Early Detection and Treatment of Colorectal Cancer, University of Dundee. For services to Public Health.
- Professor Jennifer Temkin. Professor of Law, City Law School, University of London. For services to Criminal Justice.
- Jan Thirlaway. Transformation and Planning Lead, Department for Work and Pensions. For services to Pensions Operations.
- Huw Vaughan Thomas. Auditor General, Wales. For services to Public Audit and Accountability in Wales.
- Brenda Dianne Hebb Trenowden. Head of Financial Institutions Group, ANZ Bank and Global Chair, 30% Club. For services to Exports in the Financial Sector and Gender Equality.
- Alun Howard Tucker. Lately Member, UN International Criminal Tribunal for the former Yugoslavia. For services to International Justice.
- Dr Ian David Twinn. For political and voluntary service.
- Professor Katherine Jane Willis. Director of Science, Royal Botanic Garden, Kew and Professor of Biodiversity, University of Oxford. For services to Biodiversity and Conservation.
- Jeanette Winterson, OBE. Writer. For services to Literature.
- Councillor David Leslie Wood. Councillor, Newcastle City Council. For political and public service.

==== Officer of the Order of the British Empire (OBE) ====
Military

- Commander Stephen Ronald Anderson, RN.
- Colonel Steven John Francis, Royal Marines.
- Commander Ian Harrop, RN.
- Commander Tristram Andrew Harry Kirkwood, RN.
- Commander Graeme Peter Knox, RN.
- Commander Christopher Maxwell New, RN.
- Acting Lieutenant Colonel Lloyd John Purser, MBE, Royal Marines.
- Lieutenant Colonel Diane Margaret Allen, VR, Intelligence Corps, Army Reserve.
- Lieutenant Colonel Kevan Bolam, Royal Corps of Signals.
- Lieutenant Colonel William Bolam, Royal Regiment of Artillery.
- Lieutenant Colonel Dean David Canham, The Mercian Regiment.
- Lieutenant Colonel Raymond Carolin, VR, General List, Army Reserve.
- Lieutenant Colonel Michael David Cornwell, The Princess of Wales's Royal Regiment.
- Lieutenant Colonel Nathan Crew, The Royal Logistic Corps.
- Lieutenant Colonel Timothy John Gerald Stevens Purbrick, VR, The Royal Lancers, Army Reserve.
- Lieutenant Colonel Piers Guy Beresford Strudwick, The Royal Regiment of Scotland.
- Lieutenant Colonel Craig Sweeting, Corps of Royal Electrical and Mechanical Engineers.
- Lieutenant Colonel Huw William Islwyn Thomas, Royal Army Medical Corps.
- Group Captain James Anthony Beck.
- Wing Commander Simon James Boyle.
- Group Captain Emily Jane Flynn.
- Group Captain Paul David Froome.
- Wing Commander Martin James Higgins.
- Wing Commander Christopher Jones.
- Group Captain Simon Robert Strasdin.

Civil

- James Allan, Grade 7, Ministry of Defence. For services to Defence.
- Gillian Margaret Alton, Chief Executive Officer, Grimsby Institute Group. For services to Education.
- John Alvis, M.B.E., Director, Alvis Brothers Ltd. For services to Cheese Exports, Farming and Rural Communities.
- Linda Arkley. For political service in the North East of England.
- Paula Dawn Assheton, Head, Operational Assurance, Border Force, Home Office. For services to Border Security.
- Manoj Kumar Badale, Chair, British Asian Trust. For services to the Economy and to charity.
- Marshall Charles Bailey. For services to the Financial Sector and to charity.
- Dr. Michael John Baker, Grade 6. For services to Defence.
- Dr. Anne Bamford, Lately Director of Education, Archdiocese of Southwark. For services to Education.
- Deborah Marie Barnes, Executive Director, Children's Social Care, Lincolnshire County Councill. For services to Children's Social Care.
- Dr. Ian Nicholas Basnett, Director of Public Health and Associate Medical Director, Barts Health NHS Trust. For services to Public Health.
- Matthew Alexander Charlton Bell, Lately Chief Executive Officer, Committee on Climate Change. For services to Combatting Climate Change.
- Judith Sarah Bernstein, Joint Head, Coroners, Burials, Cremation and Inquiries Policy Team, Ministry of Justice. For public service.
- Professor Julian Fleetwood Bion, Professor of Intensive Care Medicine, University of Birmingham. For services to Intensive Care Medicine.
- Jeremy David Blyth, Senior UK Accreditor, Galileo Programme and Chair, European Galilieo Security Board. For services to UK and EU Security.
- Roger Philip Bourne, Deputy Head, Aerospace Hub, Department for Business, Energy and Industrial Strategy. For services to the British Aerospace Industry.
- Professor Denise Ann Bower, Professor, Engineering Project Management, University of Leeds. For services to the Engineering and Construction Industries.
- John Oswald Boyle, Governor and Lately Chair of Directors, The Blackpool Sixth Form College. For services to Education.
- Patricia Anne, Mrs. Bradwell, Deputy Leader, Lincolnshire County Council. For services to Local Government.
- Richard William Bridgman, Founder and Owner, Warren Services Ltd. For services to apprenticeships for young people.
- Captain Andrew John Brigden, Maritime Manager, Cornwall Council. For services to the UK Ports and Maritime Industry.
- Sonia Kumari Brooks, Deputy Governor, HM Young Offenders Institution Feltham. For services to HM Prison Service and to the Criminal Justice System.
- Gillian Anne Brown, Leader and District Councillor, Arun District Council. For services to Local Government and to the community in West Sussex.
- Paul Royston Caseley, Senior Fellow, Cyber and Information Systems, Defence Science and Technology Laboratory. For services to Defence.
- Larissa Anna Chase, Deputy Head, Information Communication and Technology, 10 Downing Street. For public service.
- Pargan Singh Cheema, Chief Executive, The Scottish Grocers’ Federation. For services to Business, to Community Cohesion and to charity.
- Professor Peter Leslie Chiodini, Consultant Parasitologist, The Hospital for Tropical Diseases. For services to Parasitology and to Malaria.
- Dr. Neil Gareth Churchill, Director, Patient Experience, NHS England. For services to the Voluntary Sector and to Carers.
- Professor Lionel John Clarke, Co-chair, SynBio Leadership Council and Director, BionerG. For services to the Synthetic Biology Sector.
- Sarah Clarke, Lately Championships Director, All England Lawn Tennis Club. For services to Sports Administration.
- Trevor David Clarke, Director for International Services, Great Ormond Street Hospital NHS Foundation Trust. For services to Healthcare.
- Dr. William Ian Clements, Chair, Health Care and Social Care Board. For services to Healthcare and to the community in Newtownards, Northern Ireland.
- David John Climie, Lately Project Director, The Forth Replacement Crossing Project, Transport Scotland. For services to Engineering.
- Alice Mary Coote, Mezzo Soprano. For services to Music.
- Brian Joseph Cosgrove. For services to the UK Animation Industry.
- Professor Robert John McArthur Craig, Provost Emeritus, Heriot-Watt University Malaysia. For services to Higher Education.
- Margaret Elizabeth Crawford. For services to Education.
- Mark John Criddle, Volunteer, Torbay Lifeboat Station. For services to Maritime Safety.
- Steven James Crocker, Director of Children's Services, Hampshire County Council. For services to Children's Social Care in Hampshire and the Isle of Wight.
- Elizabeth Ruth Cuddy, Board Member, Radius Housing. For services to the Social and Affordable Housing Sector in Northern Ireland.
- Professor Alison Jean Davenport, Professor in Corrosion Science at the University of Birmingham. For services to Electrochemistry and Corrosion Science.
- Dr. Janet Beryl Davis. For services to the Natural Environment and Walkers in Great Britain.
- Robert John Davis, Governor, HM Prison Belmarsh. For services to HM Prison and Probation Service.
- Andrew John Davison. For services to the Environment, to Culture and to the community in North East England.
- Jermain Colin Defoe, Footballer. For services to the Jermaine Defoe Foundation.
- Simon Denegri, National Director for Patients, Carers and the Public, National Institute for Health Research. For services to Public Health and Social Care Research.
- Patrick Sibley Jan Derham, Headmaster, Westminster School, London. For services to Education.
- Pradip Khodidas Dhamecha, Chief Executive, Dhamecha Group. For services to Exports, to Economic Growth and to Philanthropy.
- David Dickinson, Chief Executive Officer, Waterton Academy Trust. For services to Education.
- Dr. Darrin Matthew Disley, Lately Chief Executive Officer, Horizon Discovery Group. For services to Business, to Enterprise and to Health.
- Byron Leon Dixon, Director, Micro-Fresh International. For services to Industry and Innovation.
- Montagu Denis Wyatt Don, Horticulturalist, Writer and Broadcaster. For services to Horticulture, to Broadcasting and to charity.
- David Harry Done, Chief Executive Officer, Richmond Housing Partnership. For services to Housing Provision.
- Veronica Donovan, Consultant Midwife for Foetal Medicine, Birmingham Women's and Children's NHS Foundation Trust. For services to Midwifery.
- Annette Dryburgh, Senior Operational Advisor, Women's Strategy Team, Scottish Prison Service. For services to Women Offenders.
- Catherine Duffy, Founder, RVH Liver Support Group. For services to People with Liver Disease and to their Carers in Northern Ireland.
- Jane Elsa Duncan, President, Royal Institute of British Architects. For services to Diversity in the Architecture Profession.
- Ruth Anne Duston, Owner, Primera Corporation and Chief Executive, Victoria Business Improvement District. For services to the Business Community in Central London. (Mrs Casey)
- Stewart James Edgar, Q.F.S.M., Chief Fire Officer and Director of Operations, Gloucestershire County Council. For services to Local Government.
- Professor Sian Ellard, Consultant Clinical Scientist, Royal Devon and Exeter NHS Foundation Trust and Professor Genomic Medicine, University of Exeter. For services to Patient Care.
- Marianne Elliott, Theatre Director. For services to Theatre.
- Professor Paul Emery, Director, Leeds Rheumatic and Muskoskeletal Biomedical Research Unit, Leeds Teaching Hospitals NHS Trust. For services to Rheumatology.
- Professor Pamela Enderby, M.B.E., Emeritus Professor of Community Rehabilitation, University of Sheffield. For services to Speech and Language Therapy.
- Jeffrey Ennis, Councillor, Metropolitan Borough of Barnsley. For parliamentary and political services.
- Martin Frederick Emmanuel Ephson, Co-founder and Director, Fermoie. For services to Design and Manufacturing.
- Julia Evans, Chief Executive Officer, Building Services Research and Information Association. For services to the Construction Industry.
- Norman Frazer Evans. For services to the Economy and to charity.
- Hugh David Facey, M.B.E., Managing Director and Chairman, Gripple Ltd and Loadhog Ltd. For services to Manufacturing, to Innovation, to Exports and to Employee Ownership.
- Vincent Paul Ferguson, Founder, Inciner8 Ltd. For services to Exporting and Manufacturing in North West England and to charity.
- Miss Patricia Eileen Fernon, Deputy Head Commercial, Land Equipment, Ministry of Defence. For services to Defence Procurement.
- Fenella Marion Fielding, Actress. For services to Drama and charity.
- Dr. Andrew Kerr Fraser, Director of Public Health Science, NHS Health Scotland. For services to Healthcare.
- Thomas Brough Gardiner, Assistant Director, Competent Authority, HM Revenue and Customs. For services to Revenue Protection and to Youth Sport.
- Professor Peter John Giblin, Emeritus Professor of Mathematics, University of Liverpool. For services to Mathematics.
- Michele Giddens, Co-founder, Bridges Fund Management and Chair, National Advisory Board for Impact Investment. For services to International Development and to Social Finance.
- Nitesh Got, D.L., Founder and Chief Executive, Avanti Schools Trust. For services to Education.
- David Peter Gosnell, Executive Chairman, Old Bushmills Distillery. For services to the Economy in Northern Ireland.
- Professor Kenneth Thomas Victor Grattan, FREng, Royal Academy of Engineering, George Daniels Professor of Scientific Instrumentation and Dean, Graduate School, City University of London. For services to Science.
- Professor Deborah Greaves, Head, School of Engineering, University of Plymouth. For services to Marine Renewable Energy, to Equalities and to Higher Education.
- Suzanne Jean Greaves, Assistant Director, Trade Bill Manager, Department for International Trade. For services to Government Legislation.
- Andrew Gregory, Deputy Director, Head of Transport Security Operations Centre. For services to Transport Resilience.
- Michael Haines, Presenter, Global Acts of Unity. For voluntary service to Tolerance and Education in the UK and Abroad.
- Brenda Ann Norma Hale. For political service.
- Kathryn Ann, Mrs. Halford, Chief Nurse, Barking, Havering and Redbridge University Hospitals NHS Trust. For services to Nursing.
- Stephen Geoffrey Hall, Head of Rural Statistics, Department for Environment, Food and Rural Affairs. For voluntary and charitable service.
- Matthew Hare, Chief Executive, Gigaclear. For services to Broadband Provision in the UK.
- Robin Charles Moreton Harper, Lately Chairman, Scottish Wildlife Trust. For services to Nature Conservation and to Public Life in Scotland.
- Stephen Thomas Hatherall, Team Leader, New Employment Model Implementation Programme. For services to Armed Forces Personnel.
- Michael Hay, M.B.E., Chef de Mission, Great Britain and Northern Ireland 2018 Winter Olympic Games. For services to Sport.
- Dr. Augustus Casely-Hayford, Curator, Cultural Historian and Broadcaster. For services to Arts and Culture.
- Patrick Ian Hulme, Co-founder and Director, Fermoie. For services to Interior Design and to Manufacturing.
- Patrick Joseph Heneghan. For parliamentary and political services.
- Karen Hoe, Parent Participation Coordinator and Volunteer, National Network of Parent Carer Forums. For services to Children with Special Educational Needs and Disabilities.
- Clare Yvonne Horrocks, Lately Principal Judge, War Pensions and Armed Forces Compensation Chamber. For services to the Armed Forces and to the Administration of Justice.
- Norman James Houston, Director, Northern Ireland Executive Bureau, Washington DC. For services to the Promotion of Northern Ireland Overseas.
- Robert Noel Hudson, Lately Director, All-Wales Collaborative. For services to the NHS in Wales.
- John James, Chief Executive, Sickle Cell Society. For services to People Affected by Sickle Cell Disease.
- Robert John James, Managing Director, AerFin Ltd. For services to Exports in the Aerospace Industry.
- Dr. Ian William Jardine, Lately Chief Executive, Scottish Natural Heritage. For services to the Environment.
- Keith Samuel Jarrett, Devolution Spending Control Analyst, HM Treasury. For services to Devolution and to Public Finances.
- Professor Phillip John, Executive Chair, SCHOLAR Forum. For services to Education in Scotland.
- Ms Eleanor Sally Johnson, Director of Organ Donation and Transplantation, NHS Blood and Transplant. For services to Organ Donors and Recipients.
- Professor David Emrys Jeffreys Jones, Dean, Faculty Trainees, National Institute for Health Research and Professor of Liver Immunology, Newcastle University. For services to Liver Disease and Training.
- Julian Raphael Nathaniel Joseph, Musician. For services to Music.
- Julie Ann Joseph, Chief Executive, Common Thread Ltd. For services to Childcare Provision in Scotland and to charity.
- Anthony Oluwafemi Olaseni Joshua, MBE, Boxer. For services to Sport.
- James Kane, Estates Area Manager, Scottish Prison Service. For services to the Scottish Prison Service and to charity.
- Professor Anne-Maree Keenan, Assistant Director, NIHR Leeds Biomedical Research Centre, Leeds Teaching Hospitals NHS Trust. For services to Podiatry.
- Shahana Khan. For voluntary service to Healthcare and Social Housing in the West Midlands.
- Dr. Robert Edward Klaber, Consultant, General Paediatrics Imperial College Healthcare NHS Trust. For services to Paediatric Care.
- Roger Kline, Lately Head of Strategy and Delivery, NHS Workforce Race Equality Standard, NHS England. For services to Equality in the NHS.
- Keira Christina Knightley. For services to Drama and charity.
- William Stuart Laing, Lately Chair, Houlden Jewellers. For services to the Jewellery Industry.
- Pritpal Singh Linda, Managing Director, DSL Group (Nottingham) Ltd. For services to Business, to charity and to the community in Nottingham.
- Brian James Landers, Lately Chairman, Companies House. For services to the Economy.
- Dr. Norman Alexander Lannigan, Lately Head, Pharmacy and Prescribing Support Unit NHS Greater Glasgow and Clyde. For services to Pharmaceutical Care and Medicines Management.
- Professor Richard John Last, Vice-Chancellor, Norwich University of the Arts. For services to Higher Education.
- Professor James Law, Professor of Speech and Language Science, Newcastle University. For services to Speech and Language Therapy.
- Adam Troy Lawrence, Lately Chief Executive, Royal Mint. For public service and services to the community in South Wales.
- Peter John Lawrence, Founder, Guardianship (Missing Persons) Bill 2017. For services to the Families of Missing Persons.
- Jeremy Richard Paflin Lee, Lately Deputy Director, Border Force, Home Office. For services to Border Security.
- Richard Leman. For services to Hockey.
- Steven Edward Leone, Headteacher, Stone Hill School, Doncaster. For services to Education and Children with Special Educational Needs and Disabilities.
- Ruth Louise Lester, Honorary Consultant, Birmingham Children's Hospital. For services to Children and Young People with Limb Deformities.
- Professor Foo Yew Lieu, Gardiner Professor of Immunology, University of Glasgow. For services to Science and Medicine, particularly in Scotland and Hong Kong.
- Rowena Jane Elizabeth Limb, Area Director, East and South East Midlands, Cities and Local Growth Unit, Department for Business, Energy and Industrial Strategy. For services to the Economy.
- Amandeep Singh Madra. For services to Punjabi and Sikh Heritage and Culture.
- Professor Jane Marshall, Professor, School of Health Sciences, City University of London. For services to Education in Health Sciences.
- Joseph Michael Martin, Lately Project Director, Queensferry Crossing. For services to the UK Construction Industry.
- Stephen James Martin, Q.P.M., Assistant Chief Constable. For services to Policing and the community in Northern Ireland.
- Laurie Anne Matthew, Founder, Eighteen and Under. For services to Young People and Survivors of Sexual Abuse.
- Christina McComb, Senior Independent Director, British Business Bank. For services to the Economy.
- Ian McCubbin, Lately Senior Vice President, GlaxoSmithKline and Chair, Medicines Manufacturing Industry Partnership. For services to the Pharmaceutical Industry.
- William Hay McCurrach, Curriculum Head, Food, City of Glasgow College. For services to Education in the Hospitality Industry.
- Lieutenant Colonel Kimberly Anne McCutcheon, Lately Commanding Officer, First Aid Nursing Yeomanry. For services to the First Aid Nursing Yeomanry and Emergency Response in London.
- Diana Barbara McKenna, Head, Specialist Disabled Children's Services, Derbyshire County Council. For services to Children and Young People with Special Educational Needs and Disabilities.
- Dr. Katharine McLean, Executive Medical Director and Chief Operating Officer, NHS Improvement. For services to Leadership in the NHS.
- Katherine Sally McMath, County President, Girlguiding West Lothian. For services to Girlguiding and to the community in West Lothian.
- John McRobert, Principal Engineer, Department of Infrastructure. For services to Engineering in Northern Ireland.
- Charles McSherry, Director, Lanarkshire Enterprise Services Ltd. For services to Business, to Education and to Small Businesses in Scotland.
- John McVay, Chief Executive, Producers Alliance for Cinema and Television. For services to the Media and Creative Industries.
- Deirdre Elizabeth Michie, Chief Executive, Oil and Gas UK. For services to the Oil and Gas Industry.
- Dr. Marnie Millard, Group Chief Executive Officer, Nichols plc. For services to International Trade and Businesses in North West England.
- Ms Anne Josephine Moore, Lately Senior Vice President, Royal College of Surgeons. For services to Neurosurgery and Surgical Standards.
- Abi Morgan, Screenwriter. For services to Theatre and Screenwriting.
- Angela Morgan, Lately Chief Executive, Includem. For services to Children and Families.
- Dr. Mary Teresa Morley, Lately Director of Therapies, South West London and St George's Mental Health NHS Trust. For services to Occupational Therapy.
- Farshid Moussavi, Architect. For services to Architecture.
- Tobias Hamilton Mulder, Senior Manager, People Programme, National Crime Agency. For services to Law Enforcement and to Diversity.
- His Honour Riaz Hassan Naqvi, Resident Judge, Sovereign Base Area Cyprus. For services to Defence.
- Caroline Newling, Theatre Producer. For services to Theatre.
- Alexander Mark Nileshwar, Senior Professional, Special Projects Delivery Team. For services to Military Capability.
- Professor Donal Joseph O’Donoghue, Medical Director, Health Innovation Manchester. For services to Kidney Patients.
- Edward Charles O’Hare. For services to the Construction Industry and Entrepreneurship.
- Richard John Oidfield. For services to the Canterbury Cathedral Appeal and to charity.
- Dr. Diana Jane Owen, Lately Director, The Shakespeare Birthplace Trust. For services to Culture and to Tourism.
- Professor Keith Palmer, Chair, Industrial Injuries Advisory Council. For services to Occupational Health and Medicine.
- Marlize Palmer, Departmental Records Officer, Welsh Government. For services to Information Management.
- Michael Park, Chief Executive, Scottish White Fish Producers Association. For services to Marine Conservation.
- Dhruv Prashant Patel. For voluntary service to the British Hindu community and to Social Cohesion.
- Mark Andrew Polin Q.P.M., Chief Constable, North Wales Police. For services to Policing.
- Allison Cook Ramsay, Lately Lead Nurse, Learning Disabilities, NHS Forth Valley. For services to Learning Disability Nursing.
- Kumar Sureshchandra Raval, Founder of Faith in Leadership. For services to Leadership Education and to Inter-faith Cohesion.
- Dr. Syed Tanzeem Haider Raza, Consultant Physician, The Royal Bournemouth and Christchurch Hospitals NHS Foundation Trust. For services to Health and Medical Education.
- Cathleen Pauline Reeves, Deputy Director, Road User Licensing Insurance and Safety, Department for Transport. For services to Local Sustainable Transport.
- Malcolm Richardson, National Chairman, Magistrates' Association. For services to the Administration of Justice.
- Ian Russell Ritchie, Lately Chief Executive, Rugby Football Union. For services to Sports Administration.
- Claire Elizabeth Robins, Headteacher, Scholars' Education Trust and Member of the North West London South Central Headteacher's Board. For services to Education.
- Diane Mary Rochford, Executive Headteacher, John F Kennedy Special School and Chair, Rochford Review. For services to Education.
- Paul Roseby, Chief Executive Officer and Artistic Director, National Youth Theatre. For services to Drama and Young People.
- Dr. Ashok Roy, Clinical Lead, Learning Disabilities, Health Education England. For services to People with Learning Disabilities.
- Lucinda Valerie Russell, Racecourse trainer, Arlary House Stables. For services to Horse Racing.
- Dr. Amarjit Kaur Samra, Director of Research, Medical Directorate. For services to Defence Medical Research.
- Jeffery Howard Savory. For services to Disability Sport.
- Peter Edgar Scott, Chief Executive, UK Independent Living Fund Scotland. For services to People with Disabilities.
- Professor Laura Maria Serrant, Professor of Nursing, Sheffield Hallam University. For services to Health Policy.
- Andrew Michael Gordon Sharpe. For voluntary political service.
- Richard Charles Edwin Smith, Director, The Tank Museum. For services to Military Heritage.
- Stuart Graham Smith, Non Executive Director, CAFCASS and Director of Adult and Children's Services, Calderdale Council. For services to Children's Social Care.
- Norman Springford, Lately Executive Chairman, Apex Hotels. For services to the Scottish Tourism Industry.
- Darren Styles, Publisher and Ambassador, GREAT Campaign. For services to the Economy, to Diversity and to charity.
- Professor Tong Sun, Professor of Sensor Engineering, City University of London. For services to engineering
- Robert Symonds, Chair, WISE Academies Trust. For services to Education.
- Sally Elizabeth Tallant, Director, Liverpool Biennial. For services to the Arts.
- Professor Carol Elizabeth Tannahill, Director, Glasgow Centre for Population Health and Chief Social Policy Adviser, Scottish Government. For services to Public Health.
- Sally Jennifer Joan, Mrs. Tennant, Patron, Tommy's. For services to Research into Miscarriages and Stillbirths.
- Dr. Stephen Thomas, Principal of Medetec, Independent Medical Device Consultant (Wound Dressings) and Medical Writer. For services to the NHS.
- Anne Kathleen Tiivas, Director, Child Protection in Sport Unit. For services to Safeguarding Children and Young People.
- Jack Crossley Tordoff, M.B.E., Chair, JCT600 Ltd. For services to Business and to the community in West Yorkshire.
- Sophie Henrietta Turner Laing, Chief Executive Officer, Endemol Shine Group. For services to the Media.
- Professor Samantha Carole Twiselton, Director, Sheffield Institute of Education. For services to Higher Education.
- Barry James Allen Charles Valentine, Barrister-at-Law. For services to the Legal Profession and to the Courts.
- Vanessa, Mrs. Vallely, Managing Director, www.wearethecity.com. For services to Women and the Economy.
- Michael John Wade. For services to Government and to the Economy.
- Arjun Chainrai Waney, Entrepreneur. For services to the Restaurant Industry.
- Neil Kenneth Warwick, Business Development Partner, Square One Law. For services to the Economy and to Young People in the North East.
- Lindsey Margaret Watt, Lately Headteacher, Castleview Primary School. For services to Education in Edinburgh.
- Dr. Joan Freeman Webber, Principal Pathologist, Forest Research (Centre for Ecosystems, Society and Biosecurity). For services to Tree Health.
- Catherine Louise Webster, Deputy Head, Devolution Settlements Division, Cabinet Office. For services to the Constitution.
- Angela Williams, Principal, Huddersfield New College. For services to Education.
- Professor Laurence Glynn Williams, Lately Chair, Committee on Radioactive Waste Management. For services to Nuclear Safety and to Radioactive Waste Management.
- The Right Honourable Jennifer Nancy Willott. For political and public service.
- Professor Debbie Wiseman, M.B.E., Composer and Conductor. For services to Music.
- Professor Charles David Alexander Wolfe, Professor of Public Health, King's College London. For services to Stroke and Public Health Medicine.
- Roisin Wood, Chief Executive, Kick It Out. For services to Tackling Discrimination and Exclusion in Football.
- Dr. Wendy Jane Woodhouse, Consultant Child and Adolescent Psychiatrist, Oxford Health NHS Foundation Trust. For services to Mental Healthcare for Children and Young People.
- Dr Lucy Worsley, Historian and Chief Curator, Historic Royal Palaces. For services to History and to Heritage.
- Agnes Rose Forrest Wylie, Artist. For services to Art.
- Elizabeth Anne Yarnold, MBE, Athlete. For services to Winter Olympic Sport.
- Katherine Patricia, Mrs. Yates, Administrative Officer, Personal Tax Operations, HM Revenue and Customs. For services to Vulnerable Customers.

Diplomatic Service and Overseas List

- Rosalie Louise Adams – For services to the British Virgin Islands.
- Professor David Alexander – For services to UK/US links in the space industry and to higher education.
- Sarah Bartholomew – For services to British foreign policy and to the Commonwealth.
- James John Beer – For services to British foreign policy.
- Chief Superintendent Simon Blatchley – For services to UK police.
- Julia Bond – For services to the Foreign and Commonwealth Office.
- Mary Catherine Brown – For services to charity.
- James Alexander John Burns – For services to UK/Spain relations.
- David Stuart Burton – For services to British foreign policy.
- Elizabeth Louise Chapman – For services to British foreign policy.
- Joanna Coles – For services to journalism and the media industry.
- Diane Louise Corner – For services to UK/Africa relations and international peace and security.
- Kalpna Doshi – For services to the financial services industry.
- Flora Jane Duffy – For services to sport in Bermuda.
- Claire Evans – For services to British foreign policy and the Commonwealth.
- Mark Allen Farrell – For services to British foreign policy.
- Judith Ann Gibbins – For services to British foreign policy.
- Duncan Norman Hill – For services to national security.
- Martin Robert Johnston – For services to UK trade and exports to Iran.
- Paul Meyer – For services to British foreign and security policy.
- Jerry Mimassi – For services to British foreign policy.
- Richard Peter Pascoe – For services to UK/China relations.
- Leonard Arthur Phillips – For services to international security.
- Dr. Matthew James Tertius Preston – For services to British foreign policy.
- Jane Frances Rumble – For services to Polar science, marine conservation and diplomacy.
- Rebecca Ann Sagar – For services to British foreign policy.
- James Michael Harold Spencer – Director, Feedback Madagascar, For services to health, to social development, to education and to the environment in Madagascar.
- Lieutenant Colonel Giles Alick Parry Taylor, MBE – For services to UK interests in Lebanon and to UK and Lebanon national security.
- Miss Iona Clare Thomas – For services to British foreign policy.
- Simon Derek Thomas – For services to British foreign policy.
- Stephen Peter Wallis – For services to international security.

Isle of Man

- Roger William Smith – For services to British watchmaking

Guernsey

- Jurat Stephen Murray Jones. For services to the Royal Court, to Local Charities and to the Community in Guernsey

==== Member of the Order of the British Empire (MBE) ====
Military

- Lieutenant Commander William John Edgar Ball, RN.
- Lieutenant Commander Hugh Walter Scott Botterill, RN.
- Warrant Officer 1 Engineering Technician (Communication Information Systems) Daniel Castle, RN.
- Chief Petty Officer (Seaman) Jay Early, RN.
- Lieutenant Commander Fiona Jean Haynes, RN.
- Leading Engineering Technician (Weapon Engineering) James Gordon Jose, RN.
- Commander Andrew Kellett, RN.
- Lieutenant Commander Alastair Blevins Ley, RN.
- Marine (now Lance Corporal) Nirmal Purja, Royal Marines.
- Commander Heather Elizabeth Rimmer, RN.
- Lieutenant Commander Brian Joseph Trim, RN.
- Staff Sergeant Sohail Ashraf, Adjutant General's Corps (Staff and Personnel Support Branch).
- Major Nicola Jane Parry-Belcher, The Royal Logistic Corps.
- Warrant Officer Class 2 Duncan Edward Booth, Corps of Royal Electrical and Mechanical Engineers.
- Acting Colonel David John Michael Carson, Army Cadet Force.
- Major Daryl Richard Collins, Royal Corps of Signals.
- Major Daniel Michael Conlon, The Mercian Regiment.
- Major Pardeep Singh Dhillon, Intelligence Corps.
- Captain Gareth Edward Dibble, Royal Regiment of Artillery, Army Reserve.
- Captain Rebecca Pogson-Hughes-Emanuel, Corps of Royal Electrical and Mechanical Engineers.
- Major Christopher Fogarty, Royal Corps of Signals.
- Warrant Officer Class 1 Sean Henry Pawlingardner, 1st The Queen's Dragoon Guards, Army Reserve.
- Lieutenant Colonel Paula Michelle George, Adjutant General's Corps (Educational and Training Services Branch).
- Acting Lieutenant Colonel Stuart Wesley Grout, Corps of Royal Electrical and Mechanical Engineers, Army Reserve.
- Warrant Officer Class 2 Andrew Ian Halliday, Royal Army Physical Training Corps, Army Reserve.
- Major John Edward Mead Carey-Hughes, The King's Royal Hussars.
- Major Walter George Hunter, The Royal Regiment of Scotland.
- Staff Sergeant Kenneth Joseph Johnston, Queen Alexandra's Royal Army Nursing Corps.
- Acting Major Lucy Diana Kirkpatrick, Royal Regiment of Artillery.
- Warrant Officer Class 2 Jason Liddy, Small Arms School Corps.
- Major Joel Thomas Malpas, Army Air Corps.
- Major Jonathon Mark Murley, Corps of Royal Electrical and Mechanical Engineers.
- Major Stephen Palfreyman, Royal Corps of Signals, Army Reserve.
- Sergeant Timothy James Rice, The Parachute Regiment.
- Major Anthony Mark Richardson, Royal Regiment of Artillery.
- Lieutenant Colonel Terence Robson, Adjutant General's Corps (Staff and Personnel Support Branch).
- Colour Sergeant Trevor Hamilton Ross, The Royal Irish Regiment, Army Reserve.
- Captain Louis Sebastian Rudd, The Parachute Regiment.
- Warrant Officer Class 2 Craig John Rutter, The Yorkshire Regiment, Army Reserve.
- Warrant Officer Class 2 Darren Sobey, Royal Regiment of Artillery.
- Lieutenant Colonel Justin George Edward Stenhouse, DSO, 1st The Queen's Dragoon Guards.
- Major Guy Allan Hadley Thoburn, Intelligence Corps.
- Corporal Thomas Alexander Whyte, Intelligence Corps.
- Major Edward Michael George Willcox, The Royal Welsh.
- Lieutenant Colonel David Alistair Willey, Royal Army Dental Corps.
- Flight Lieutenant Victoria Anne Atherton.
- Warrant Officer Richard Phillip Barber.
- Squadron Leader Stephen Matthew Beardmore.
- Warrant Officer Kevin Ffrancon Beattie.
- Master Aircrew Mark Andrew Bradley.
- Warrant Officer Alan Stuart Bruce.
- Squadron Leader James Niall Doyle.
- Flight Sergeant Hywel Anthony Greening.
- Flight Lieutenant Kathryn Hannah Janes.
- Wing Commander Adrian Russell Jarvis.
- Squadron Leader Stuart Gray McAdam.
- Squadron Leader Vanessa Jasmin Kathleen Plumley.
- Flight Sergeant Louise Jane Simpson.
- Sergeant Kevin John Stannard.
- Warrant Officer Lee Raymond Twyning.
- Corporal Melvin Robert David Whyte.

Civil

- Ajaz Khowaj Quoram Ahmed – Founder, AKQA. For services to Media.
- Timothy Charles Robert Noel Bentinck (The Earl of Portland) – Actor. For services to Drama.
- Stacey Dooley – Journalist and Presenter. For services to Broadcasting.
- Sarah Margaret Gordy – For services to the Arts and People with Disabilities.
- Niomi Arleen McLean-Daley – Rapper, Songwriter and Record Producer. For services to Music.
- Orphy Everton Robinson – Musician and Composer. For services to Music.
- Dennis George Rollins – Jazz trombonist. For services to Music.
- Gary Wilmot – Actor. For services to Drama and charity.

Diplomatic Service and Overseas List

- Justina Susannah Alexander – For services to British Nationals in Dominica.
- Rebecca Emma Bell – For services to British foreign policy and to the Commonwealth.
- Joseph Chiara – For services to St John's Ambulance, Gibraltar.
- Robert Hatherell Craig – For services to conservation.
- Peter John Derby-Crook – For services to education and to the British Community in Singapore.
- Sharleen Sabrina Dabreo – For services to disaster management in the British Virgin Islands.
- Anthony James Day – For services to the homeless and underprivileged in China.
- Fiona Decan – For services to the British Community in Andorra.
- Louise Mary Ellis – For services to British foreign policy and to the Commonwealth.
- John Percival Morey Farrand – For services to the Foreign and Commonwealth Office.
- Ernest Gomez – For services to Gibraltar.
- Nichola Margaret Valerie Hayton – For services to UK/Germany relations.
- Peter McNeill Helme – For services to the Foreign and Commonwealth Office.
- Christopher Hugh Hildesley – For services to charity.
- Joseph Solomon Horn – For services to charity, to educational development and to UK relations with China and Thailand.
- Jane Elizabeth Bickmore-Jaffer – For services to education in Oman.
- Samantha Clare Whay-Jenkins – For services to education and to the promotion of British business.
- Stephen Jones – For services to British Nationals overseas.
- Paul Anthony Lewis – For services to UK/Australia bilateral trade and commerce.
- Franz Manderson – For services to the Cayman Islands.
- Alan McLean – For services to the security of Her Majesty's Government staff overseas.
- Judith Joy Mewburn – For services to nursing in the developing world.
- Frederick Vijay Hutton-Michel – For services to National Security.
- Dr. Anthony Wynne Pereira – For services to UK/Brazil relations.
- Sister Imelda Mary Magdalen Poole – For services to combating modern slavery.
- Anne-Marie Pieterz-Powell – For services to British Nationals overseas.
- Sunil Rattu – For services to British foreign policy.
- David John Reynolds – For services to UK/Philippine relations and to underprivileged children in the Philippines.
- Winifred Leigh Roebuck – For services to British foreign policy and security.
- Norbert Nicholas Sene – For services to Gibraltar.
- Howard Martin Silverstone – For services to British business in the USA.
- David Nicolas Wahl – For services to UK/France relations.
- James Robert Wasilenko – For services to British foreign and security policy.
- John Heseltine Cameron-Webb – For services to British Nationals overseas.
- Anya Kashora Williams – For services to the Turks and Caicos Islands.
- Gavin Willis – For services to British foreign policy.
- David Alfred Wood – For services to British Nationals in Guadeloupe.
- Jacqueline Louise Wrafter – For services to children with disabilities in Vietnam.
- Ann Desson Wragg – For services to the Foreign and Commonwealth Office.

Isle of Man

- Lesley Anne Turnbull. For services to seriously ill children, their parents and to their families on the Isle of Man.

Guernsey

- Keith William Robins. For services to vulnerable young people and their families in Guernsey.

Jersey

- Andre Bonjour. For services to the Sea Cadet Corps in Jersey.
- Ian Robert Richardson. For services to Jersey hospice care.
- Susie Hilary Josling Robins. For services to Jersey Citizens’ Advice Bureau.

=== British Empire Medal (BEM) ===
Civil

- Susan Tracy, Mrs. Abnett, Childminder and lately Volunteer, Professional Association for Childcare and Early Years. For services to Early Years Education.
- Frances, Mrs. Acton. For services to the community in Barrow Upon Soar, Leicestershire.
- Joy, Mrs. Adams, Volunteer, Edenholme Care Home. For services to Older People in Stonehaven, Aberdeenshire.
- Ms Pavandeep Ahluwalia, Henna Artist. For services to the Beauty Industry. (Mrs Dhanjal).
- Patricia, Mrs. Ainger. For services to the community in Daventry, Northamptonshire.
- Andrew Davidson Ainslie, Pipe Major, Duns Pipe Band. For services to Music and to the community in Berwickshire.
- Dr. Frank MacDonald Akerman, Trustee and lately Honorary Secretary, Romsey and District Society Buildings Preservation Trust. For services to Conservation in Romsey, Hampshire.
- James Lawrence Allen. For services to the community in Byfleet, Surrey.
- Siobhan Mary, Mrs. Allister. For charitable services.
- Donald William Andrews. For services to the community in Pewsey, Wiltshire.
- Peter John Angus. For services to the community in Dingwall, Ross-shire.
- Jane, Mrs. Asher. For voluntary service to Swimming.
- Gina Lorraine, Mrs. Awad. For voluntary service to those with Dementia in Devon.
- Joyce Angela Jasmine, Mrs. Azis. For services to the community in Petworth, West Sussex.
- Lyndon Howard Baglin. For services to Brass Band Music.
- Archibald Campbell Baird, Curator, Heritage of Golf Museum, Gullane. For services to the History of Golf.
- Gordon Balmforth. For services to Music and to charity in Kirklees.
- Ms Olga Margaret Bannister, Branch Head, South Yorkshire Motor Neuron Disease Association. For services to those with Motor Neuron Disease and to their Carers.
- Raymond Barden. For services to the community in Pett, East Sussex.
- John Gerald Barley. For charitable services in Berkshire.
- Michael Frederick Barnes. For services to Charitable Fundraising and to the community in Haslemere, Surrey.
- Robert Sydney Barnes, Trainer and Parent Consultant, Adoption UK. For services to Adoption.
- Iva, Mrs. Barr. For services to Charitable Fundraising in Bedford.
- Laurence John Bates. For services to Young People in Lancashire.
- Margaret Amethe Napier, Mrs. Baxter. For services to People with Sight Impairment and to the community in Stowmarket, Suffolk.
- John Berry. For services to Young People in the UK and Abroad and to the community in Northern Ireland.
- Joseph Henry Berry. For services to Music and to the community in Newry, County Down.
- Joan Mary, Mrs. Bishton. For services to the community in Wigan.
- Firefighter Denis Henry Black. For services to the Northern Ireland Fire and Rescue Service in County Tyrone.
- Cynthia Lesley, Mrs. Bond. For services to the community in Chippenham, Wiltshire.
- Ann Elizabeth, Mrs. Boorman, Founding Member, Truro Homeless Action Group. For services to Homeless People in Truro, Cornwall.
- James Arthur Bowron. For services to Cricket in County Antrim.
- Colin Boyd. For services to Young People in West Allotment, Northumberland.
- Arnold Joseph Bradbury. For services to charity and to the community in Barnstaple, North Devon.
- Miss Mary Brennan. For services to the community in Cross Green, Leeds.
- Brian Robert Budge, World Wars Historian. For services to Military History in Orkney.
- Michael Francis Burke, Peripatetic Caseworker, Staffordshire County Council. For services to Children and Young People with Special Educational Needs and Disabilities.
- Janette Elizabeth, Mrs. Burt, Volunteer, Dementia UK. For services to those with Dementia and to their Families.
- Gwendoline, Mrs. Butler, Founder, Bunny Burrows Rescue. For services to Animal Welfare and Rescue in North Yorkshire.
- Miss Doreen Mary Malize Calder. For services to Equestrianism and to the community in Berwickshire.
- Leveson Granville Andrew Campbell. For services to the Church of England and to the Community in East Suffolk.
- Enrico Fortunato Capaldi. For services to charity and to the community on Teesside.
- John Maurice Chambers. For services to Equestrian Sport.
- Robert Samuel Charleston, Volunteer Rescue Officer, St Ives Coastguard. For voluntary service to the Coastguard Rescue Team.
- Roger Mason Charnley. For services to Business and to the community in Burley-in-Wharfedale, West Yorkshire.
- Anne Fiona, Mrs. Cherriman, Governor's Secretary and Management Co-ordinator, HM Prison Stafford. For services to charity and to the community in Stafford.
- Keith John Clarke. For services to charity and to the community in Northern Ireland.
- Special Chief Officer Benjamin Peter Clifford, British Transport Police. For services to Policing.
- Miss Christabel Cofie, Programme Support Officer. For charitable service in the UK and Ghana.
- Rosemary, Mrs. Cole, Director of Music, Tamar Valley Male Voice Choir and Accompanist, South Hams Folk Dancing Club. For services to the Performing Arts in South West England.
- Carol May, Mrs. Coleman. For services to Amateur Theatre and to the community in Rhiwbina.
- David Kenneth Compton, Volunteer Warden, Old Winchester Hill National Nature Reserve, Hampshire. For services to Nature Conservation.
- David Conder, Volunteer. For charitable services.
- Ms Jessica Helen Cook, Founding Director, Can You Hear Us? For voluntary services to Neurofibromatosis Type 2 Patients.
- Lowri Ann, Mrs. Cope. For services to the community in Helmshore, Lancashire.
- James John Corcoran. For services to charity in the UK and Abroad.
- Elizabeth Margaret, Mrs. Costello. For services to the Arts and to charity in the community in Leigh, Greater Manchester.
- Hugh William Crawford, Telephony Adviser. For services to the community in County Durham through Martial Arts.
- Colette Margaret Catherine, Mrs. Cunningham, Director, Scottish North American Business Council and Events Manager, CBI Scotland. For services to Business and Public Service.
- Stewart Dakers. For services to Disadvantaged People in Farnham, Surrey.
- Joan Elizabeth, Mrs. Darbyshire. For charitable services.
- Ms Susanna Daus, Service Manager, Adoption, Fostering and Contact, Islington Borough Council, London. For services to Adoption and Fostering.
- Christine Charlotte Louise, Mrs. Mathez-Davey, Chairman, Friends of Kenwood. For services to the Preservation of Historic Houses.
- Wyndham Richard Davidson, Swimming Coach. For services to Swimming Coaching in Shropshire and the West Midlands.
- Elsie May, Mrs. Davies. For services to Disadvantaged People in County Durham.
- John Malcolm Davies. For services to the community in Waltham Forest, London.
- Margaret Ann, Mrs. Davies, Co-founder and Trustee, South Bucks Down's Syndrome Group. For services to those with Down's Syndrome.
- Sharon, Mrs. Davies, Senior Executive Assistant, Health and Social Services Department, Welsh Government. For public service.
- Eluned Margaret Ramsey, Mrs. Clifton-Davies, First Aid Trainer and Assessor, St John Ambulance Wales. For voluntary service to First Aid Training.
- Stephen George Davis. For services to the community in Milborne Port, Somerset.
- Gladys, Mrs. Dawson. For services to charity and to the community in Clifton, Bedfordshire.
- Eleanor Marshall, Mrs. Deans. For services to the community in Londonderry.
- Eileen Dorothy Elsie, Mrs. Dilley. For services to the Women's Institute in Herefordshire.
- Joan, Mrs. Dixon. For services to Young People Abroad and in Barnstaple, North Devon.
- James William Donaldson. For services to Cricket in the community in Bristol.
- Ms Cliona Donnelly. For services to Music and Young People in Northern Ireland.
- Robert Eric Donnison. For services to Football in Nottinghamshire.
- Susan, Mrs. Downer. For services to Children with Disabilities and Young People in Dorset and Somerset.
- Mary Cleland Bilsland, Mrs. Duckett. For voluntary service in Larkhall, Hamilton and South Lanarkshire.
- Councillor Lisa Ann Duffy. For services to the community in Ramsey, Cambridgeshire.
- Michael John Duggan. For services to Disability School Sport.
- Marie Ann, Mrs. Dunbar, Playgroup Leader, St Columba's Playgroup, Annan. For services to Early Years Education and to the community in Dumfries and Galloway.
- Christine, Mrs. Dunster. For services to the community in Solihull, West Midlands.
- Ms Yvette Suzanne Duval, BAME Mental Health Manager, Diverse Cymru. For services to the BAME community in Wales.
- Anthony Clive Ebbutt. For services to charity and to the community in Burton upon Trent, Staffordshire.
- Sarah Ann, Mrs. Edwards, Volunteer Engagement Officer, Professional Association for Childcare and Early Years. For services to Early Years Education.
- Caroline Dorothy, Mrs. Evans. For charitable services in Dorking, Surrey.
- Hilary Pauline, Mrs. Evans. For services to the community in Burnham, Buckinghamshire.
- Jane Alison, Mrs. Ewing, Office Manager, Galleywall Primary City of London Academy. For services to the community in Bermondsey, London.
- Samuel James Fanaroff, Founder, The Sussex Guild. For services to Craftspeople in Sussex.
- Lowry Alexander Ferguson. For services to the community in County Tyrone.
- Miss Emily Jane Findlay. For services to Cancer Awareness and to charity in Orkney and the North of Scotland.
- Jeffrey Thomas Fletcher. For services to the community in Telford, Shropshire.
- Brenda, Mrs. Fogg. For services to Homeless People in Llandudno, Wales.
- Ms Emma Louisa Ford. For services to Riding for the Disabled in Buckinghamshire.
- Dorothy Mary, Mrs. Fowler. For services to Young People and to the community in Sawtry, Cambridgeshire.
- Andrew Paul Gilliat. For services to the community in Shobdon, Herefordshire.
- Malgorzata Kazimiera, Mrs. Goddard, Executive Officer, Polish Records Section, Army Personnel Centre. For services to Defence and to the Polish Veterans community.
- Philip Gomersall. For services to Horticulture in Yorkshire.
- Kathryn, Mrs. Gower. For services to the community in Cross Roads with Lees and Haworth, West Yorkshire.
- Edward Leszek Gradosielski. For services to Beekeeping and to voluntary service.
- Isabel Ann, Mrs. Grant, Lately Finance and Administration Assistant, Aberdeen and Grampian Chamber of Commerce. For services to the Aberdeen Business Community.
- Jane Jeanie Jenny, Mrs. Gray. For services to the Scouting Movement and to the community in Newmachar and Aberdeen.
- Margaret Ellen, Mrs. Gray. For services to the Ulster Garden Scheme.
- William Arthur Gribben. For services to the Ulster Branch, Irish Rugby Football Union and to Disability Sports.
- Jacqueline Dawn, Mrs. Haggerwood. For voluntary and charitable services to the community in Clapham, Bedfordshire.
- Special Constable Russell Alan Hall, Special Constable, Devon and Cornwall Police. For services to Policing and the community in Fowey and Looe, Cornwall.
- Robert Terence Halliday. For services to the community in Anfield, Liverpool.
- Evelyn Elizabeth, Mrs. Hanna. For services to the community in County Down.
- Ms Frances Hannaway. For services to the community in Northern Ireland.
- Dr. Nadine Hachach-Haram, Plastic Surgery Registrar, NHS Clinical Entrepreneur, Founder of Proximie. For services to Surgery and to Innovation.
- Miss Angela Harding. For services to Girlguiding and Young Girls in Sefton, Merseyside.
- Jennifer Anne, Mrs. Harrison, Chair of Trustees, Birmingham Vernon Unit, Sea Cadet Corps. For voluntary service to Young People and to the community in Birmingham.
- Margaret Elise, Mrs. Hassall. For services to the community in Stafford.
- Maureen, Mrs. Hawe. For services to the community in Castlecaulfield, County Tyrone.
- Barbara Fay, Mrs. Hawkins. For services to charity and to the community in Port Isaac, Cornwall.
- Gordon Hawkins. For services for the Boys’ Brigade and to the community in West Moor, Tyne and Wear.
- Professor Josephine Angela Haythornthwaite, Convenor, Board of Trustees, Maryhill Integration Network. For services to Asylum Seekers in Glasgow.
- Ada Anna, Mrs. Haywood. For voluntary service to Cancer Research UK.
- Scott Heath. For services to LGBT community.
- James Somerville Henderson. For services to the Royal Scottish Pipe Band Association (Northern Ireland) and to the community in Ballinamallard and Trillick.
- Margaret Iris, Mrs. Henderson. For services to the community in Northern Ireland.
- Maureen, Mrs. Hindle, Volunteer, Patient Experience Team, Mid Essex Hospital Services NHS Trust. For services to Patients and to the community in Essex.
- Thomas Edwin Hirst. For services to the community in Wakefield, West Yorkshire.
- Eleanor Scott, Mrs. Hogarth, Founder and Manager, Charity for Care Shop, Kelso. For services to charity in the Scottish Borders.
- Patricia Irene, Mrs. Holder. For charitable service to Save the Children.
- Miss Jennifer Mary Holloway, Volunteer, Acocks Green Badgers, St John Ambulance. For voluntary service to First Aid Training and to the community in Birmingham.
- Stephen Andrew Holmes, Recovery Worker, Intensive Team, Avon and Wiltshire Mental Health Partnership NHS Trust. For services to Mental Health.
- Linda Anne, Mrs. Howe. For services to the community in Honington and Sapiston, Suffolk.
- Roger Charles Hudd. For services to charity and to the Arts.
- Edward Hudson, Founder and Chairman, Bibles for Children. For services to Education.
- David Raymond Humphreys. For services to Education and to Geology.
- Ivan Hunter, National Charter and Rules Advisor, The Royal Naval Association. For voluntary service to Naval Personnel.
- Christopher Paul Illsley. For services to charity in Lincolnshire.
- The Reverend David Arthur Ireland. For services to the community in Mickleham, Surrey.
- Margaret, Mrs. James. For services to the Jubilee Sailing Trust and to the community in Olveston, Bristol.
- Michael Ebrahim Jeewa. For services to Asian People with Disabilities in London.
- William Henry Gerwyn Jenkins. For services to the Samaritans in Swansea.
- James Richard Johnston. For services to Royal Ulster Constabulary George Cross Association, County Armagh.
- Charles Byron Jones. For services to charity and to the community in Bristol.
- Frances Kilgour McFarlane, Mrs. Jones, Founder and lately Organiser, Coeliac Group, Glasgow. For services to People with Coeliac Disease.
- Pamela Susan, Mrs. Jones. For services to Disabled Children, Young People and their Families in the Forest of Dean, Gloucestershire.
- Susan, Mrs. Jones. For services to Foster Care Children and to the Church.
- Courtney Christine Pamela, Mrs. Saunders-Jones, Volunteer, The Connor Saunders Foundation. For services to Young People in Brighton and Hove.
- Frank Jordan, Honorary President, Menzieshill Whitehall Swimming and Water Polo Club. For services to Swimming and Water Polo in Dundee.
- Michael John Jukes, Volunteer Community First Responder, South Central Ambulance Service NHS Foundation Trust. For services to Emergency Response and to Fundraising.
- Noreen Elizabeth, Mrs. Kavanagh. For services to the community in Northern Ireland.
- Dorothy, Mrs. Kay. For services to the community in Dane Valley, Cheshire.
- Leslie Kay. For services to Older People in the Jewish community in Manchester.
- Ewen Grant Kellas. For services in the community in Horsmonden, Kent.
- Dr. Colin Kenny. For services to Diabetes Care in Northern Ireland.
- Professor Ralph Charles Kester. For services to Rugby Union Football in Yorkshire.
- Georgina Valerie, Mrs. Kitchener. For services to Sport in Surrey through the Pony Club.
- Alastair Knowles. For services to the community in Musselburgh.
- Diana Clare, Mrs. Knox. For services to the community in Wrotham, Kent.
- Gillian, Mrs. Lake. For services to the Voluntary Sector in Bedfordshire.
- Samuel David Briers Larmour. For services to Boxing and to Community Relations.
- Hazel, Mrs. Latus. For voluntary service to the Arts in Bognor Regis.
- Robert John Lawrence. For political and public service.
- Maureen Janis, Mrs. Lee. For services to Young People and to the community in Chelmsford, Essex.
- Susan, Mrs. Lewis, Paediatric Epilepsy Specialist Nurse, County Durham and Darlington NHS Foundation Trust. For services to Nursing.
- Sylvia, Mrs. Lewis. For services to Charitable Fundraising in Merseyside.
- Soorendra Lingiah, Chair, Minority Ethnic Group for All, Kingston Hospital NHS Foundation Trust. For services to BAME Patients.
- Ann Elizabeth, Mrs. Liverton. For services to Families, to Children and to the community in East Devon.
- Miss Margaret Kathleen Livingston, Secretary, Bronte Society, Irish Section. For services to Literary Culture in Northern Ireland.
- Ms Jenifer Elizabeth Sara Livingstone. For services to the community in County Armagh.
- Maureen Frances, Mrs. Lloyd. For services to Older People and to the community in Chippenham, Wiltshire.
- Ms Patricia Lock, (Gilmore), Senior Clerical Officer, School of History, Anthropology, Philosophy and Politics, Queen's University Belfast. For services to the community in Northern Ireland.
- Margaret Rose, Mrs. Lodge. For services to the community in Bishop Monkton, North Yorkshire.
- John Herbert Lowe, Trustee, Institution of Mechanical Engineers and the Museum of Power. For services to STEM Education.
- Ms Charlotte Elizabeth Macdonald. For services to the Special Olympics and to Riding for the Disabled.
- Rosemary, Mrs. Macdonald. For services to the community in Wiltshire.
- Diana Clark, Mrs. Macintosh, Chair, Save the Children, Helensburgh. For services to charity.
- Tom Maddison. For services to the community in Great Ayton, North Yorkshire.
- Stephen Maden. For services to Blind and Partially Sighted People in Pendle, Lancashire.
- Dr. Nishma Dilip Manek, General Practitioner Trainee and Founder, Next Generation GP. For services to General Practitioner Leadership Development.
- Miss Margaret Rose Marley. For voluntary service to the community in Londonderry.
- Elizabeth, Mrs. Marshall. For services to the community in Great and Little Chesterford, Essex.
- Ms Sarah Marzaioli, Team Administrator, Speech and Language Therapy Department, East Sussex Healthcare NHS Trust. For services to Speech and Language Therapy.
- Tahir Masood. For services to Young People to the community in Peterborough.
- John David Mathers, Proprietor, Newforge House, Magheralin. For services to Hospitality and Tourism in Northern Ireland.
- Sandra Fenella, Mrs. Matlow. For services to the community in South Manchester.
- Cecilia Rosalind Giselle, Mrs. Denlegh-Maxwell. For services to the community in Worcestershire.
- Kenneth McChlery, Administrative Assistant, Border Force, Glasgow. For public service and to the community in Glasgow.
- Dr. Kelvin John McCracken. For voluntary service to the community in Ballynahinch, Northern Ireland.
- Karen Anne, Mrs. McCurry, Manager, Multiple Sclerosis Centre, Mid Argyll. For services to Healthcare and charity.
- William Hugh McFetridge. For services to Sport.
- Dorothy Ann, Mrs. McGovern. For services to the community in Folkestone, Kent.
- Francis Ashcroft McKnight, Treasurer, Lancashire Branch, SSAFA. For voluntary service to ex-Service Personnel the Royal Naval Lifeboat Institute and to charity.
- Deborah, Mrs. McLean, Honorary President, Save The Children Grampian Branch. For services to the community in Aberdeenshire and to charity.
- Mary, Mrs. McLean. For services to the community in Northern Ireland.
- Linda Davidson, Mrs. McLeod, Chair, Breathe Easy Clackmannanshire. For services to those with Lung Conditions.
- James Ronald McMurray. For services to Education.
- Dr. Derek McPherson. For services to Education and to charity.
- James McQuade. For services to Music in the community in Sleaford, Lincolnshire.
- Vijya, Mrs. Mehta. For services to Heritage in the Public Sector.
- Stephen Merredew. For services to the community in New Addington, Croydon.
- John Barry Metcalfe. For services to the community in Mickleton, Gloucestershire.
- Ms Rosalind Jane Miller, Development Director, Islington Faiths Forum. For services to Interfaith Cohesion in the London Borough of Islington.
- Cathleen Anne, Mrs. Millwood. For services to the community in Stratford-Upon-Avon, Warwickshire.
- William Miles Morgan. For charitable services to the Bristol Aero Collection Trust.
- Meirion Lloyd Morris, Chairman, Hoddesdon Youth Centre. For services to Young People.
- Robert Morrow. For services to the community in Glenarm, County Antrim.
- Walter Bruce Mullan. For services to the Boys’ Brigade in Stewartstown, County Tyrone.
- Tyler Murphy, Founder and Volunteer, Tylers Trust. For services to Young People with Debilitating Illnesses and Vulnerable Families in West Sussex.
- Christine Drusilla, Mrs. Neil. For services to charity in Shropshire.
- Jacqueline, Mrs. Neill. For services to Education and to the community in Northern Ireland.
- Sheenah, Mrs. Nelson. For services to Macmillan Cancer Support and to Heart charities in West Dunbartonshire and Lomond.
- Jennifer Hazel, Mrs. Newman. For services to the community in Exmouth, Devon.
- Jayne, Mrs. Nicholls. For services to Care Standards for Patients with Learning Disabilities in Wales.
- Jennifer Mary Haldane, Mrs. Nutt. For services to the community in Pangbourne, Tidmarsh and Sulham, Berkshire.
- Gordon Danson Oates. For services to the community in Fleetwood, Lancashire.
- Ms Geraldine Ann O’Kane. For services to Peace Building and to Community Development in Whitewell, Northern Ireland.
- Clive Owen. For services to Older People in Wales.
- Anne, Mrs. Pack, Personal Assistant to the Chief Executive, Hutton Institute. For services to Agricultural Research, to Scottish Culture and to charity.
- Alastair Paisley. For political and public service.
- Trevor Palmer. For services to People with Disabilities in Wales.
- Diane Jean, Mrs. Pannell. For services to Amateur Music Making in the community in Suffolk.
- Robert Alfred Parke. For services to the community in Eglinton, County Londonderry.
- Patricia Ann, Mrs. Parker. For services to the community in Hull.
- Nicola, Mrs. Parry, Associate Director of Nursing and Head of Midwifery, Blackpool Teaching Hospitals NHS Foundation Trust. For services to Midwifery.
- Ruxmani Thakorbhai, Mrs. Patel, Secretary, Krishna Temple. For charitable and voluntary services to the community in Bolton.
- Thomas John Patrick. For charitable service to the community in Northern Ireland.
- David John Pearce, Trustee, Midland Freewheelers Blood Bikes Charity. For voluntary and charitable services to Healthcare.
- Bernice, Mrs. Pearlman. For services to the community in Leeds, West Yorkshire.
- Elizabeth Clark, Mrs. Pearson. For services to Music and Education in Lanarkshire.
- Pamela Mary, Mrs. Pearson. For services to Young People and to the community in Macclesfield, Cheshire.
- Raymond Henry Peart. For services to Injured Service Personnel and to charity.
- Martin James Perry, Services Officer, Intellectual Property Office. For services to Intellectual Property and to charity.
- Fylaktis Philippou. For services to Hairdressing and to the community in St James's, London.
- Neil Ronald James Philipps, Volunteer and Fundraiser, Uttoxeter Community First Responders. For services to Emergency Care.
- Rosemary Shelley, Mrs. Philipps. For charitable services to the local community in West Kent.
- Ms Mairi McIntyre Philp. For services to the community in Comrie, Perthshire.
- David Neil Poole. For services to the community in Pinner, Middlesex.
- Allan James Pope. For services to Young People and to the community in Brixworth, Northamptonshire.
- Shirley Diana, Mrs. Potts. For services to the community in South Gloucestershire.
- Dr. Agimol Pradeep, Volunteer Nurse, Manchester University NHS Foundation Trust. For services to Organ Donation.
- Wendy Avril, Mrs. Pressdee. For services to Welsh Netball.
- Miss Elizabeth Ann Price. For services to the community in Great Milton, Oxford.
- Janet Susan, Mrs. Price. For services to charity and to the community in Bewdley, Worcestershire.
- Terence John Henry Price. For services to the community in West Bromwich, West Midlands.
- Miss Alison Pugh, Clinical Nurse Manager, Royal Gwent Hospital. For services to Haematology and Cancer Care.
- Roger William Pullen, Patient Experience Volunteer, Northern Devon Healthcare NHS Trust. For services to the community and Patients in North Devon.
- Kenneth John Hilary Pullin. For services to Archaeology and Heritage in Northern Ireland.
- David Robertson Ramsay. For services to Heritage, to Special Needs Education and to charity in Kincardineshire.
- Maureen, Mrs. Reilly, Chair, Lostock Community Partnership. For services to the community in Lostock, Manchester.
- Ms Judith Catherine Reynolds, Project Director, Social Enterprise. For services to Higher Education.
- Elizabeth, Mrs. Rice, Piper, Moodiesburn and District Pipe Band. For services to Music Education.
- Mary Anne, Mrs. Richardson, District Nursing Sister, County Durham and Darlington NHS Foundation Trust. For services to Patient Care.
- Jonathan James Ridd. For services to Care Standards for Patients with Learning Disabilities in Wales.
- Ruth, Mrs. Ridge. For services to the Gower Society and to the community in Gower.
- John Edward Riley. For services to the community in Chester.
- Matthew Ring. For services to the communities in the City of London and City Fringe.
- Matthew Ritchie. For services to Older People in Larne, County Antrim.
- Luke Steven Rodgers, Director and Founder, Foster Focus. For services to Children and to Families.
- Stuart Jeffrey Rogers, Postmaster, Ashburton Post Office. For services to the Post Office and to the community in Ashburton, Devon.
- Terence John Rogers. For services to the community in Saffron, Leicester.
- Howard Rose, Funding and Publicity Director, Balsall Common Primary School, Coventry. For services to Education.
- Barbara, Mrs. Rosenberg. For services to the community in Maidenhead, Berkshire.
- Anne Elizabeth, Mrs. Ross. For services to Families of Young People with Special Needs.
- Patricia Morven, Mrs. Roulston, Police Service of Northern Ireland. For services to Policing.
- Diana, Mrs. Rudd. For services to Girlguiding and to Young People in Londonderry.
- Ralph Owen Rudden. For voluntary services to the community in Sale West, Greater Manchester.
- Anne Elizabeth Sarah, Mrs. Rush. For services to the community in Barnham Village, North Suffolk.
- Pamela Ida Mable, Mrs. Ruthvan, Lately Chair, Pokesdown Community Forum. For services to the community in Pokesdown, Dorset.
- Abdul Aziz Sardar. For services to the community in Tower Hamlets, London.
- Darran Francis, Mrs. Saunders, Volunteer, The Connor Saunders Foundation. For voluntary service to Young People in Brighton and Hove.
- Sheila Constance, Mrs. Saunders. For services to the community in Ketton and Barrowden, Rutland.
- Alexander Derek Scott, Honorary President, Angus, Fife and Perthshire, Royal British Legion Scotland. For voluntary service to ex-Service Personnel.
- Dr. Hasmukhlal Vadilal Shah. For services to the Hindu community in Cardiff.
- Pauline, Mrs. Bradley-Sharp. For services to the community in Hirst Wood, Shipley, West Yorkshire.
- Gordon Robert William Simmonds. For services to the Church Community in Rochford, Essex.
- George Ronnie Simmons. For services to the community in Rye, East Sussex.
- Marie Louise, Mrs. Skelton, Executive Officer, Northern Ireland Court Service. For charitable and voluntary service.
- David James Slack. For voluntary services to the community in Kent and Berkshire.
- Herbert William Michael Slaughter. For services to the Royal Artillery Association and to the community in Norwich, Norfolk.
- Elaine, Mrs. Sleeman. For services to Music.
- Connie, Mrs. Smillie, Executive Officer, Programme Support to UK Aid Direct. For public and voluntary service.
- Debra Elizabeth, Mrs. Smith, Manager, Macmillan Cancer Information and Support Centre, Manchester University NHS Foundation Trust, Wythenshawe Hospital. For services to Nursing.
- Lawrence Tristram Smith. For services to the community in Lewisham and Bromley, London.
- Nicola Anne, Mrs. Spinks, Fell Runner. For services to Sport and charity.
- Rhona Phylis, Mrs. Stanex, Chair and Events Organiser, The Belles of Belmont Ladies Club. For services to the community in East Belfast.
- Caroline, Mrs. Steffens. For services to Vulnerable People in Devon.
- Allan Hamilton Stewart, Founder, Team Chivas. For charitable service.
- Andrew Francis Stimson. For services to Older People in Wandsworth, London.
- Garry Swann, Honorary Archivist, Doncaster and Bassetlaw Teaching Hospitals NHS Foundation Trust. For services to the NHS.
- Marie Louise, Mrs. Tait, Healthcare Assistant, Coventry and Warwickshire Partnership NHS Trust. For services to Older and Mentally Ill Patients.
- Sue Ann, Mrs. Tatham. For services to the community in Mickleham, Surrey.
- Anne Kathleen, Mrs. Tattersall. For services to the community and to charity in North Devon.
- Kevin Harold Taylor, Chairman, Hyde Fundraisers. For charitable service.
- Peter Andrew Templeman, Curriculum Technician in Carpentry and Joinery, Oaklands College, Hertfordshire. For services to Technical Education.
- Janet, Mrs. Thompson, Secretary, Farnborough and District Stroke/ Aphasia Group. For services to Aphasia Sufferers.
- George Markby Thornton. For services to Cross Community Relations in Bellanaleck, County Fermanagh.
- Ms Jill Diana Todd. For services to the community in Tower Hamlets, London.
- Watch Commander Joanne Todd, Hertfordshire Fire and Rescue Service. For services to the Prince's Trust Team Programme, Hertfordshire.
- Elaine Sandra Mary, Mrs. Trump, Volunteer, Buckinghamshire Healthcare NHS Trust. For services to Fundraising and Voluntary Support for the NHS.
- Michael Gregory Tye. For services to the community in Heath and Holmewood, Chesterfield, Derbyshire.
- Susan Jane, Mrs. Veale. For services to Disabled People in Devon.
- Anne, Mrs. Veck. For services to Figure Skating.
- David Paul Walker, J.P. For services to the community in Sandwell, West Midlands.
- Nicholas Richard Walker, Director, Puffer Preservation Trust and Skipper, the VIC 32. For services to Tourism, to Marine Heritage and to charity.
- Pauline, Mrs. Walker. For services to Swimming for Young People with Down's Syndrome.
- Paul Wallace, Head Gardener, Queen's University Belfast. For services to Higher Education and to the community in Belfast.
- Ralph James Warburton. For services to the community in Audlem, Cheshire.
- Phillip Lewis Ward. For services to the community in Bayton and Clows Top, Worcestershire.
- John Watson. For services to Charitable Fundraising and to the community in West Scrafton, North Yorkshire.
- The Reverend Marina Jeffrey-Watson. For services to the Church and to the community in Westgate-on-Sea, Kent.
- Charlotte Elizabeth, Mrs. Weir, Volunteer, Glasgow City Mission. For voluntary service in Glasgow and Arran.
- Iris, Mrs. Whitaker. For services to charity and to the community in Ainsdale, Merseyside.
- Lily Pamela, Mrs. Whymer. For services to the Church and to the community in Stetchworth, Cambridgeshire.
- Norman John Wileman. For services to the community in Kendal, Cumbria.
- Joseph Ian Willgoose, Lately Estates Director, University of Derby. For services to Higher Education.
- Cecilia, Mrs. Woods. For services to the community in Bolton.
- Trevor Alfred Workman. For services to the British Carillon Society and to the community in Bournville, West Midlands.
- Dr. Stephen Graham Worrall. For charitable service in Eastern Europe.
- Leigh, Mrs. Yates, Chair of the Porthleven School Association of Friends, Helsten. For services to Education.
- Shirley, Mrs. Yates. For services to the community in Calderdale, West Yorkshire.
- John Samuel York, Volunteer, Young Witness Service, NSPCC. For services to Children.

=== Royal Red Cross ===
==== Associate of the Royal Red Cross (ARRC) ====
Major Karen Dorothy Jamieson, Queen Alexandra's Royal Army Nursing Corps

=== Queen's Police Medal (QPM) ===
England and Wales

- Janet Bloomfield, Lately Sergeant, Essex Police.
- Paul Brandon, Deputy Chief Constable, Kent Police.
- Chief Superintendent Sally Ann Burke, South Wales Police.
- Dean Graham Haydon, Deputy Assistant Commissioner, Metropolitan Police Service.
- Paul Francis Dominic Hurley, Lately Detective Chief Superintendent, South Wales Police.
- Sergeant Abed Hussain, Greater Manchester Police.
- Superintendent Helen Louise Isaac, City of London Police.
- Detective Chief Superintendent Russell Jackson, Greater Manchester Police.
- Stephen James Kavanagh, Chief Constable, Essex Police.
- Neville Kemp, Assistant Chief Constable, Surrey Police.
- Constable Geraldine McConaghy, Merseyside Police.
- Chief Superintendent Paul Terence Money, West Yorkshire Police.
- Hannah O’Sullivan, Lately Detective Sergeant, Metropolitan Police Service.
- James Rentell, Lately Constable, British Transport Police.
- Chief Superintendent Vicky Skeels, Cambridgeshire Constabulary.
- Detective Chief Inspector Peter Sparks, Metropolitan Police Service.
- Alistair Michael Sutherland, Assistant Commissioner, City of London Police.
- Sergeant Lindsey Sweeney, South Wales Police.

Scotland

- Superintendent Suzanne Mertes, Police Service of Scotland.
- Inspector Craig Rankine, Police Service of Scotland.

Northern Ireland

- Andrew Glen Archibald, Police Service of Northern Ireland.
- Noel Christopher Mullan, Police Service of Northern Ireland.
- Paul Stanton Slaine, Police Service of Northern Ireland.

=== Queen's Fire Service Medal (QFSM) ===
England and Wales

- Group Manager Karen Adams, Dorset & Wiltshire Fire and Rescue Service.
- Deputy Chief Fire Officer Paul Andrew Argyle, Greater Manchester Fire and Rescue Service.
- Watch Manager Robert David Coss, Derbyshire Fire and Rescue Service.
- Chief Fire Officer Huw Dennis Jakeway, South Wales Fire and Rescue Service.

Scotland

- Watch Manager Rosemary Curtis, Scottish Fire and Rescue Service.
- Group Manager Elizabeth Logan, Scottish Fire and Rescue Service.
- Area Manager William David Rout, Scottish Fire and Rescue Service.

=== Queen's Ambulance Service Medal (QAM) ===
England and Wales

- Neil Barnes, Deputy Director, North West Ambulance Service NHS Trust. For services to the North West Ambulance Service NHS Trust.
- Jason Frederick Collins, Finance Manager, Welsh Ambulance Service. For services to the Welsh Ambulance Service.
- Leanne Hawker, Patient Experience Lead and Community Involvement, Welsh Ambulance Service. For services to the Welsh Ambulance Service.
- Ian Jeffrey Walton, Deputy Director of Operations, Yorkshire Ambulance Service NHS Trust. For services to the Yorkshire Ambulance Service NHS Trust.

Scotland

- Patrick McGrattan, Paramedic, Scottish Ambulance Service.

Northern Ireland

- Richard John Bendall, Paramedic, Northern Ireland Ambulance Service. For services to the Northern Ireland Ambulance Service.

=== Overseas Territories Police Medal (OTPM) ===
- Detective Chief Inspector Na’imah Rosalie Astwood, Bermuda Police Service.
- Chief Inspector Jerome Anthony Laws, Bermuda Police Service.

=== Queen's Volunteer Reserves Medal (QVRM) ===
- Warrant Officer 1 Logistician (Supply Chain) Janice Pauline Cox, Royal Naval Reserve
- Major Nial Philip Browne, T.D., The Royal Logistic Corps, Army Reserve
- Captain Andrew James Stephen Holsgrove, The Duke of Lancaster's Regiment, Army Reserve
- Major Thomas George McFarland, The Royal Irish Regiment, Army Reserve
- Staff Sergeant Gordon Andrew Pursley, The Royal Logistic Corps, Army Reserve
- Lieutenant Colonel Gillian Heather Wilkinson, The Royal Logistic Corps, Army Reserve

== Crown Dependencies ==
Guernsey

- Stephen Jones OBE
- Keith Robins MBE
- Rosemary James BEM
- Sarah Penney Royal Victorian Medal (Silver)

Jersey

- Ian Richardson MBE
- Andre Bonjour MBE
- Susie Robins MBE
- Vicki Atherton MBE

Isle of Man

- Roger W. Smith OBE
- Voirrey Heaton MBE
- Lesley Turnbull MBE
- Pheric Thrussell BEM

== Australia ==
The Queen's Birthday Honours 2018 for Australia were announced on 12 June 2018 by the Governor-General, Sir Peter Cosgrove.

== New Zealand ==
The Queen's Birthday Honours 2018 for New Zealand were announced on 4 June 2018 by the Governor-General, Dame Patsy Reddy.

== Cook Islands ==
Below are the individuals appointed by Elizabeth II in her right as Queen of the Cook Islands with honours within her own gift, and with the advice of the Government for other honours.

=== Order of the British Empire ===
==== Knight Commander of the Order of the British Empire (KBE) ====
- His Excellency Tom John Marsters – For services to the public and to the community.

==== Officer of the Order of the British Empire (OBE) ====
- Rua Nga – For services to the community.

==== Member of the Order of the British Empire (MBE) ====
- Iro Pae Puna – For services to the public service and to the community.

=== British Empire Medal (BEM) ===
- Rima Lizzie David – For services to the public service and to the community.
- Vainepoto Makita – For services to business and to the community.

== The Bahamas ==
Below are the individuals appointed by Elizabeth II in her right as Queen of The Bahamas with honours within her own gift, and with the advice of the Government for other honours.

=== British Empire Medal ===
- Bennett Minnis – For services to business and to the community.
- Captain Vernon Ritchie – For services to business and to the community.

== Grenada ==
Below are the individuals appointed by Elizabeth II in her right as Queen of Grenada with honours within her own gift, and with the advice of the Government for other honours.

=== Order of the British Empire ===
==== Officer of the Order of the British Empire (OBE) ====
- Leslie Ramdhanny – For services to business and to the community.

==== Member of the Order of the British Empire (MBE) ====
- Madonna Harford – For services to Trade Unionism.
- Wayne Horsford – For services to education.

=== British Empire Medal (BEM) ===
- Peter Bain – For services to culture.
- Denise Williams – For services to sport.

== Papua New Guinea ==
Below are the individuals appointed by Elizabeth II in her right as Queen of Papua New Guinea with honours within her own gift, and with the advice of the Government for other honours.

=== Knight Bachelor ===
- Christopher Charles Abel – For services to the community through supporting rural agriculture extension and to citizen participation in business activity.
- Melchior Pesa Togolo – For service to economic development, particularly in the mining and petroleum sectors and to the community.

=== Order of St Michael and St George ===
==== Companion of the Order of St Michael and St George (CMG) ====
- Nora Vagi Brash, OBE – For service to the community through active promotion of local culture and heritage in her roles as author, playwright and poet.
- The Honourable Michael Buku Nali, CBE – For services to commerce, to politics and to the community as Member of National Parliament and former Deputy Prime Minister.

=== Order of the British Empire ===
==== Commander of the Order of the British Empire (CBE) ====
Military

- Colonel Paul Mai, OBE – For distinguished service to the Papua New Guinea Defence Force.
- Colonel Raymond Numa, MBE, DMS – For distinguished service to the Papua New Guinea Defence Force.

Civil

- Lucy Blanche-Lee Badina Bogari, ISO, High Commissioner to Fiji – For distinguished public service through her senior roles in the nation's foreign service.
- The Honourable Mike Reynolds, AM – For promoting relations between Queensland and Papua New Guinea, including as Mayor of Townsville and as Patron of YWAM Medical Ships Programme.
- Barry James Tan – For services to commerce, to sport and to charitable causes.
- The Honourable Justin Tkatchenko, BEM, OL – For services to the community, particularly in the National Capital District, and to sports and major events in his role as Minister for Lands & Physical Planning and APEC 2018.

==== Officer of the Order of the British Empire (OBE) ====
Civil

- Gregory Robert Anderson – For services to the community and commerce in the mining and petroleum sectors.
- Ian Chatfield Clarke – For services to the legal profession and to the business community.
- The Reverend Father Philip Gibbs – For services to the Enga Province community and to the Catholic Church.
- Samson Kaipu – For service to law, to higher education and to the community.
- Baundo Ludwik Kir – For service to the community of Simbu Province.
- Margaret Erik Korai – For service to women's participation in agribusiness.
- Susan Patricia McGrade – For services to commerce and to the community of Rabaul.
- Stephen Pokanis – For public service in the Correctional Service.
- Alurigo Ravusiro – For public service, community and sport.
- Michael Varapik – For service to corporate governance and to the community.
- The Reverend Binora Yunarec – For service to the community and to the Evangelical Lutheran Church.

==== Member of the Order of the British Empire (MBE) ====
Military

- Lieutenant Colonel Tau Rupa – For service to the Papua New Guinea Defence Force.
- Lieutenant Colonel Ricky Tavaperry – For service to the Papua New Guinea Defence Force.
- Lieutenant Colonel Kingsley Wawada – For service to the Papua New Guinea Defence Force.

Civil

- George Ariku – For services to education and to the community.
- Eddie Mariosu Avosa – For service to the Gulf provincial administration.
- Anthony Paul Carbry – For service to business management and to sport.
- Morivetta Eka – For diplomatic service and to the community.
- Philip Fae Eka – For public service in the Correctional Service.
- Basil Morehari Gregg – For service to traditional music and to culture.
- William Rauwal Gwaiseuk – For public service in agriculture.
- Tony Yalomo Hobiagi – For service to rural smallholder farmers.
- Peter Iggy – For service to business and to the community.
- Mame Kinahen Kasalau – For public service.
- Babau Dinabe Keru – For service to the United Church Tatana women fellowship.
- Elizabeth Konmil – For service to the community and to women's development.
- Joshua Maiyap – For service to the community and religion.
- Mariana Maru – For service to the Assemblies of God Church.
- Craig Douglas McCpnaghy – For service to rural development and to the community.
- Ranyia Mesaka – For service to rural administration and to the community.
- Upu Kila Navu – For service to sport, particularly Hobie Cat sailing.
- Emmanuel Pilai – For service to education and to aviation.
- Henry Koiaie Pisimi – For service to education and to the community.
- Peter Philemon Pokowas – For service to Air Niugini and to sport.
- Kini Rema – For service to education and to women's development.
- Joshua Uvau – For public service.
- John Mark Vellacott – For services to commerce and to humanitarian endeavours.
- Jerry Peter Yarl – For service to education and to the community.
- Kai Chuen Yee – For service to the Police Force.

=== Imperial Service Order (ISO) ===
- Nicks Sasingian Maniha – For public service.
- Barbara Mimino – For public service.

=== British Empire Medal (BEM) ===
Military

- Warrant Officer (Navy) John Bade – For service to the Papua New Guinea Defence Force.
- Sergeant Kale Ekol – For service to the Papua New Guinea Defence Force.
- Sergeant Alex Gini – For service to the Papua New Guinea Defence Force.
- Chief Warrant Officer Balthazar Saviembi – For service to the Papua New Guinea Defence Force.
- Warrant Officer (Army) Moses Waradu – For service to the Papua New Guinea Defence Force.

Civil

- Elizabeth Koite Aihi – For public service.
- Edward Alua – For services to the community.
- Lelly Biyang – For services to the Police Force.
- Ruth Miro Daingo – For services to Air Niugini.
- Mare Erima – For services to law and to justice.
- Moses Erowal – For services to the community.
- Hiri Evoe – For services to the community.
- Steven Tuperi Gija – For services to education.
- Amos Goronsin – For services to the community.
- Heroho Hilake – For public service.
- Kari Ken Hira – For public service.
- Tau Hovaro – For services to the community.
- Japhet Kaiae Itau'pe – For public service.
- Veari Kapi. For public service.
- Navai Seth Kevari – For public service.
- Bafua Kobati – For services to the community.
- Soweyom Kon – For services to the community.
- Jane Mumure Kware – For services to the Police Force.
- Wandibe Mobe – For services to the community.
- Nancy Eunage Neantele – For services to the Police Force.
- Martha Nola Nero – For services to healthcare.
- To’oro Oa – For public service.
- Henry Ori Ori – For services to the community.
- Stonewigg Orovo – For services to the community.
- Ragagalo Raga – For public service.
- Rupa Ray Raraimo – For public service.
- Ruth Sireh – For services to education.
- Nehap Soal – For services to the community.
- Alexis Samuel Tam – For services to entrepreneurial training.
- Christine Madeline Temu – For services to the aviation industry.
- Emile Tenoa – For services to journalism and to radio broadcasting.
- The Reverend Frank Tiproa – For services to the Evangelical Lutheran Church.
- Livai Wapia – For services to the community.
- Bauk Huinz Wesi – For services to the community.

=== Queen's Police Medal (QPM) ===
- Chief Sergeant Paul Miae – For service to the Royal Papua New Guinea Constabulary.
- Inspector Leana Moere – For services to the Royal Papua New Guinea Constabulary.
- Superintendent Samson Siguyaru – For services to the Royal Papua New Guinea Constabulary

== Solomon Islands ==
Below are the individuals appointed by Elizabeth II in her right as Queen of the Solomon Islands with honours within her own gift, and with the advice of the Government for other honours.

=== Order of the British Empire ===
==== Officer of the Order of the British Empire (OBE) ====
- Alfred Jude Aihunu – For services to education and to rural development.
- Samson Panda – For services to education, to the Church and to rural development.
- Selwyn Sahu – For services to policing, and to rural and community development.

==== Member of the Order of the British Empire (MBE) ====
- Charles Fox Rudgard Ngalimwane – For services to education and to community development.
- Isaac Vula Tatapu – For public service and to community development.
- Nelson Thoa – For services to nursing and to the community.

=== British Empire Medal (BEM) ===
- Chief Superintendent Ian Bara – For services to the Royal Solomon Islands Police Force.
- Timothy Manele – For services to rural and to community development.
- Chief Superintendent Mostyn Mangua – Royal Solomon Islands Police Force.
- Chief Superintendent Stanley Riolo – Royal Solomon Islands Police Force.

=== Queen's Police Medal (QPM) ===
- Sergeant Elizabeth Tekaingo – Royal Solomon Islands Police Force.
- Superintendent Steve Rex Waiwori – Royal Solomon Islands Police Force.

== Saint Lucia ==
Below are the individuals appointed by Elizabeth II in her right as Queen of Saint Lucia with honours within her own gift, and with the advice of the Government for other honours.

=== Order of the British Empire ===
==== Commander of the Order of the British Empire (CBE) ====
- Dr. Herbert Marius – For services to health care.

==== Officer of the Order of the British Empire (OBE) ====
- Augusta Ifill – For contribution to education.
- John Calixte Leon – For his contribution to the field of finance and economics.

==== Member of the Order of the British Empire ====
- Melzar Bruce, BEM – For her contribution to education.
- Felicite Hetty Lucien – For her commitment to community service.
- Alphonsus Stephen Stanislas – For services to education and to community service.

=== British Empire Medal (BEM) ===
- Julius Adjodha – For services to the community.
- Christina Alcide – For services to the community.
- Rita Catherine Dyer – For services to education.

== Antigua and Barbuda ==
Below are the individuals appointed by Elizabeth II in her right as Queen of Antigua and Barbuda with honours within her own gift, and with the advice of the Government for other honours.

=== Order of the British Empire ===
==== Member of the Order of the British Empire (MBE) ====
- Dr. Reginald Murphy – For contribution to preservation and promotion of Antigua and Barbuda's history and heritage.

== See also ==
- Australian Honours System
- New Zealand Royal Honours System
- Orders, decorations, and medals of the United Kingdom
