= Bielefeldt =

Bielefeldt is a low German surname.

Notable people with the surname include:

- de:Alwin Bielefeldt (1857–1942), pioneer of Allotment (gardening)
- Dirk Bielefeldt (born 1957), German actor and cabaret artist
- Heiner Bielefeldt (born 1958), German theologian, philosopher and historian
- Viggo Bielefeldt (1851–1909), Danish composer
