= John Dunston =

John Herbert Dunston FRSA (born 1952 in London) was the head of Leighton Park School and Sibford School, both English Quaker schools.

John Dunston studied Modern Foreign Languages at the University of Cambridge. He then undertook teacher training at the University of York. He taught in Germany as well as the maintained and independent sectors in England. He was an English language assistant at the Gymnasium Eppendorf, Hamburg (1973–74), a teacher and housemaster at Cheltenham Grammar School 1975–79, a teacher at Bancroft's School, Woodford Green (1979–90, head of modern languages from 1983). In 1990, he became head at Sibford School at Sibford Ferris near Banbury in Oxfordshire. In 1996, he became head at Leighton Park School in Reading, Berkshire. During his time at the school, he spent a sabbatical break as a Farmington Fellow at Harris Manchester College, Oxford in 2009, funded through the Farmington Trust. He retired as head of Leighton Park School in 2010.

Dunston became an Independent Schools Inspectorate (ISI) Inspector in 1994 and a Reporting Inspector in 2001. He was also Chairman of the Association for the Education and Guardianship of International Students (AEGIS) and the Society of Headmasters & Headmistresses of Independent Schools (SHMIS). In 2011, he became a senior advisor at RSAppointments, a specialist arm of RSAcademics that helps school governors in finding and selecting school heads.

In 1977, Dunston became an Associate of the Chartered Institute of Linguists. In 1994, he was elected a Fellow of the Royal Society of Arts. He is a governor of Shiplake College, Oxfordshire, and The John Lyon School, Harrow.

== Selected publications ==
- Keeping the Faith, Attain, Issue 2, Spring 2007.
- Johann Sebastian Bach and the Jews, The Friend, 10 April 2009.
- Germans, Jews and the Enlightenment: Lessons for today?, Farmington Institute for Christian Studies, Harris Manchester College, University of Oxford, UK, Hilary Term 2009.
- The different qualities of silence, The Times, 14 January 2010.
