= Alison Davenport =

Scientist

Alison Davenport OBE CEng
- Born: Alison Jean Davenport
- Education: University of Cambridge (BA, PhD)
- Scientific career
- Fields: Materials science Corrosion
- Institutions: Brookhaven National Laboratory; University of Manchester; University of Birmingham
- Thesis: Passivation of amorphous and polycrystalline metals (1987)
- Website: www.birmingham.ac.uk/schools/metallurgy-materials/people/profile.aspx?ReferenceId=6639

Alison Jean Davenport OBE CEng is the Professor of Corrosion Science at the School of Metallurgy and Materials, University of Birmingham.

== Education ==
Davenport studied the Natural Sciences Tripos at the University of Cambridge, where she was a member of King's College, Cambridge. She remained there for her graduate studies, earning her PhD in 1987. Her PhD was in metallurgy, investigating the oxide layers that form on top of metals.

== Research and career ==
Davenport spent eight years as a staff scientist at Brookhaven National Laboratory, looking at synchrotron X-Ray techniques for corrosion and passivation of alloys.

In 1995, Davenport joined the University of Manchester. She was Associate Editor of the Journal of the Electrochemical Society between 1995 and 1997. She has carried out several experiments at the Diamond Light Source and is a member of the I18 working group. She was appointed to at the University of Birmingham and looked at the relationship between alloy microstructures and localised corrosion chemistry. She developed X-Ray micro-tomography to study the growth of small cracks, allowing her to understand the transition from pits to cracks in metals. She studies the relationship between microstructure and corrosion in stainless steel, titanium and aluminium. She looked at the impact of grain boundary crystallography on intergranular corrosion.

Davenport uses X-Ray imaging to study corrosion. This information informs life-time prediction models. She works with synchrotron facilities to develop in situ characterisation techniques to understand the mechanisms of corrosion. Davenport leads an Engineering and Physical Sciences Research Council (EPSRC) consortium to develop synchrotron methods to look at nuclear waste storage. She has served as an international consultant on nuclear waste storage. She collaborated with Owen Addison on how corrosion impacts biomedical implants. Her group monitor the atmospheric corrosion of stainless steel alloys and have found that morphology is very sensitive to relative humidity and residual ferrite. They identified how bipolar plates corrode in proton-exchange membrane fuel cells.

=== Awards and honours ===
In 2003, Davenport won the NACE International H. H. Uhlig Award for outstanding efforts in corrosion education. In 2008, she chaired the Gordon Research Conference in aqueous corrosion. She was made a member of the Innovate UK Advanced Materials Leadership Council and the Government of the United Kingdom expert group on materials science. She was appointed a professor at the University of Birmingham in 2015. In 2016, she delivered the Birmingham Metallurgical Association lecture. She is on the working group of the Collaborative Computational Project in Tomographic Imaging. She is part of the Institute of Materials, Minerals and Mining and is involved with their women in materials science activities.

She was the Head of School of Metallurgy and Materials at the University of Birmingham (2016–2022).

Davenport was appointed Order of the British Empire (OBE) for services to electrochemistry in the 2018 Birthday Honours.
