= Sean Corbett =

Royal Air Force officer

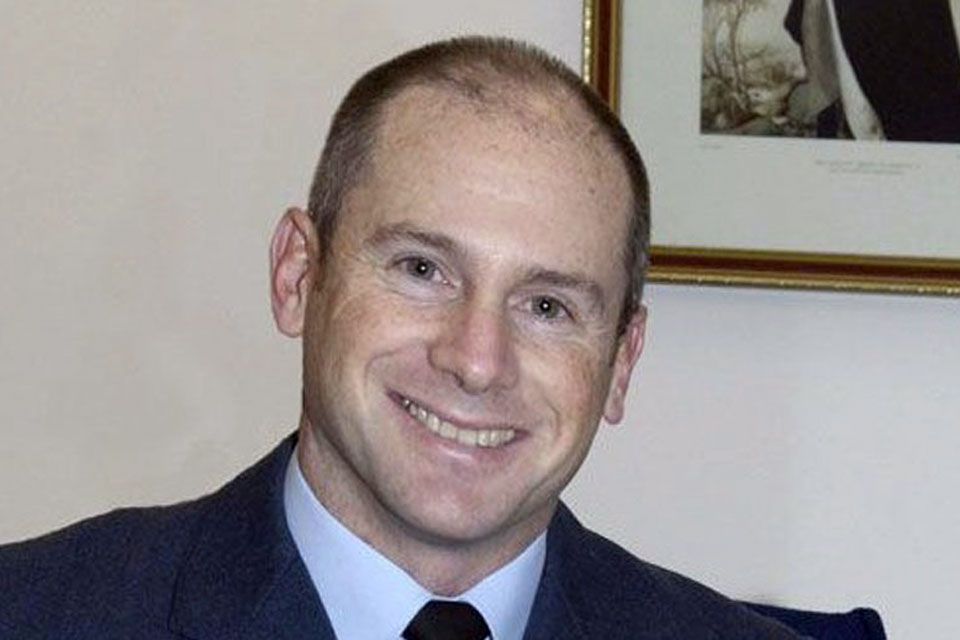
- Air Commodore Corbett in 2013
- Military career
- Allegiance: United Kingdom
- Branch: Royal Air Force
- Service years: 1988–2018
- Rank: Air Vice-Marshal
- Commands: Joint Service Signals Organisation
- Conflicts: Gulf War; Bosnian War; Kosovo War; Iraq War; War in Afghanistan
- Awards: Companion of the Order of the Bath; Member of the Order of the British Empire

Air Vice-Marshal Anthony Sean Corbett, CB MBE is a retired senior Royal Air Force officer.

== RAF career ==
Educated at Keele University where he studied geography and biology, Corbett joined the RAF in the Photographic Interpretation Branch in 1988. He was deployed on operational service during the Gulf War in 1990, the Bosnian War in the mid-1990s and the NATO bombing of Yugoslavia in 1999 as well as the Iraq War in 2005. He went on to be Commander of the Joint Service Signals Organisation at RAF Digby in 2006, Principal Staff Officer to the Deputy Supreme Allied Commander Europe at SHAPE in 2008 and Chief of UK Intelligence in Afghanistan in June 2010.

After that Corbett became Deputy Assistant Chief of Staff (Intelligence) at Permanent Joint Headquarters in March 2011, Deputy UK Military Representative to NATO and Chief of Staff of the UK Delegation in October 2011 and Assistant Chief of Staff (Intelligence) at Permanent Joint Headquarters in 2014. His last post was as Deputy Director for Commonwealth Integration at the Defense Intelligence Agency in Washington, D.C. in September 2016 before retiring in September 2018.

Corbett was appointed a Member of the Order of the British Empire in the 2000 New Year Honours and a Companion of the Order of the Bath in the 2018 Birthday Honours.
