= Geoffrey Tantum =

British spymaster

Sir Geoffrey Alan Tantum, CMG, OBE (1940–2024) was a British spymaster, MI6 Middle East controller and an SBS soldier.

He was born on 12 November 1940, the son of George Tantum and Margaret Tantum nee Goozée, and educated at Hampton Grammar School.

He was knighted in the 2018 Birthday Honours List for services to British interests overseas.
