= Dee Collins =

British police officer

- Born: Dionne Marie Collins; 1965 (age 60–61); Lymm, Cheshire, England
- Education: University of Manchester
- Police career
- Country: United Kingdom
- Allegiance: West Yorkshire Police
- Service years: 1987–2019
- Rank: Chief Constable

Dionne Marie "Dee" Collins CBE QPM (born 1965) is a British retired police officer, who served as Chief Constable of West Yorkshire Police from 2016 to 2019. She served a secondment from West Yorkshire Police to the College of Policing where she was Director for the 2019 Strategic Command Course. Due to ill health, having been previously treated for breast cancer, she stepped down as Chief Constable and retired from the police in April 2019.

== Honours ==

Ribbon	Description	Notes
	Order of the British Empire (CBE)	Commander; Civil Division; 2018 Birthday Honours
	Queen's Police Medal (QPM)	Distinguished Service; 2013 Birthday Honours
	Queen Elizabeth II Golden Jubilee Medal	2002; UK version of this medal
	Queen Elizabeth II Diamond Jubilee Medal	2012; UK version of this medal
	Police Long Service and Good Conduct Medal	

Police appointments
Preceded by Mark Gilmore	Chief Constable of West Yorkshire Police; 2016–2019	Succeeded by John Robins QPM
