= Caroline Brazier (librarian) =

British professional librarian

Caroline Brazier, CBE is a Scottish librarian. From 2013 to 2018, she was Chief Librarian of the British Library, the United Kingdom's national library.

Brazier did her undergraduate studies at the University of Edinburgh, and earned a master's degree in library and information studies at University College London. Before moving to the British Library in 2002, she worked at a number of academic and research libraries including those at Trinity College Dublin and Dublin City University. She became chief librarian in 2013.

Brazier announced her retirement in 2017, effective 2018. In the 2018 Queen's Birthday Honours, Brazier was appointed a Commander of the Order of the British Empire (CBE) for services to librarianship and to higher education.
