= Brian Ivory =

Scottish business executive

Sir Brian Gammell Ivory, CVO, CBE, FRSE, FRSA (born 10 April 1949) is a Scottish business executive, accountant and arts administrator.

== Education and career ==
Ivory graduated from the University of Cambridge with a Bachelor of Arts degree in 1971, and qualified as a chartered accountant in 1975.

He became a director of The Highland Distilleries Company in 1978, managing director ten years later, chief executive in 1994 and executive chairman in 1997 (serving until 1999).

He has also been executive chairman of Macallan-Glenlivet (1996–99) and Scottish American Investment Company (2001–16), and has been a director of several companies, including Rémy Cointreau, the Bank of Scotland and HBOS.

He is a Trustee of the Royal Collection Trust.

=== Political career ===
Outside of business, Ivory has involved himself in the administration of a number of arts organisations; he was the vice-chairman of the Scottish Arts Council between 1988 and 1992, chairman of the trustees of the National Galleries of Scotland from 2001 to 2009, and is a former chairman of the trustees of Dumfries House Trust. He was elected a Fellow of the Royal Society of Arts in 1993 and Fellow of the Royal Society of Edinburgh in 2001. He was also appointed a Commander of the Order of the British Empire in 1999, a Knight Bachelor in 2006, and a Commander of the Royal Victorian Order in the 2018 Birthday Honours.

== Financial Statement ==
For all companies where Sir Brian Gammel Ivory holds a current appointment, the aggregate cash at bank value is £103.9m, a cumulative gross capital assets valuation of £578.8m and a total existing liabilities of £237.5 m and an overall estimated net worth of £826 m.
