= Ernst Uhrlau =

German politician

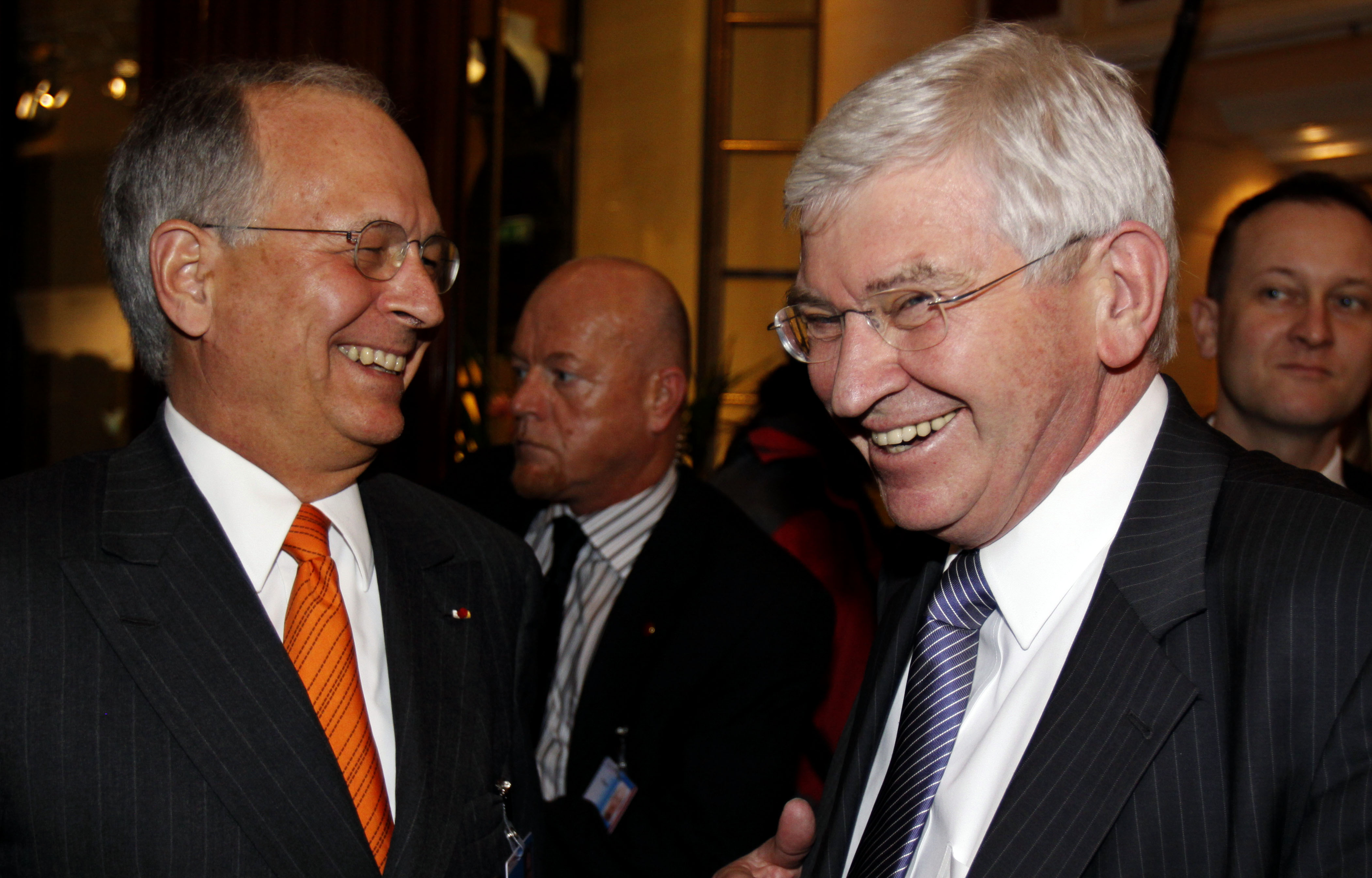
Ernst Uhrlau (r) with Wolfgang Ischinger, 2009

Ernst Uhrlau (born 7 December 1946) was the President of the German Bundesnachrichtendienst (BND). After attending Gymnasium Eppendorf, he graduated from University of Hamburg with specialization in political science.

In 1981, Uhrlau became an assistant to the Head of the Department for Protection of the Constitution of Hamburg, Christian Lochte, and in 1991 he took Lochte's place. From 1996 to 1998, Ernst Uhrlau was the Chief of Hamburg Police. In 1998, Uhrlau was appointed a Coordinator of the Intelligence Community in the office of the Chancellor.

On 1 December 2005, he was appointed to the post of the head of the BND.

The most outstanding of Uhrlau's achievements in the post of Intelligence Community Coordinator was organizing the exchange between Israel and the Lebanese Hezbollah of the bodies of captured Israeli soldiers for captured militants in January 2004. In the BND documents this operation received the name "The Blue-White Sky Action" ("Die Aktion Himmel blau-weiß"). During its realization Uhrlau had numerous contacts with representatives of both parties and repeated visits to Beirut, and he proved himself, above all, an outstanding diplomat.

It is believed Uhrlau was a mediator between Hezbollah and Israel for the return in 2008 of the remains of two Israeli soldiers, Ehud Goldwasser and Eldad Regev, whose kidnapping triggered the 2006 Lebanon war.
