= Tong Sun =

- Born: 1968 (age 57–58)
- Education: City, University of London (PhD); Harbin Institute of Technology (BS, MS, PhD)
- Awards: Royal Academy of Engineering Silver Medal (2016); Order of the British Empire (2018)
- Scientific career
- Workplaces: Nanyang Technological University; City, University of London

Tong Sun OBE FREng FIET (born 1968) is a Professor of Sensor Engineering and Director of the Research Centre for Photonics and Instrumentation at City, University of London. She was awarded the Royal Academy of Engineering Silver Medal in 2016 and awarded an Order of the British Empire (OBE) in the 2018 Birthday Honours. In 2020 she was elected Fellow of the Royal Academy of Engineering.

== Early life and education ==
Sun was born in Southern China. By the time she attended primary school, the Cultural Revolution had finished and the educational system had been restored. Sun studied engineering at the Harbin Institute of Technology. Here she worked in the Department of Precision Instrumentation, where she earned a master's degree in 1993 and doctorate in 1998. On her holidays from university, Sun's commute back to her parents' house would last 34 hours. She moved to City, University of London for a second doctorate, during which she researched optical fibres, and graduated in 1999.

== Research and career ==
After earning her doctorate Sun joined Nanyang Technological University where she worked as an Assistant Professor until 2001. She moved back to City, University of London in 2001. When she was promoted to Professor in 2008 she became the first woman to be promoted to Professor of engineering at City. She also serves as Director of the Research Centre for Photonics and Instrumentation.

Her research involves the development of optical fibre sensors to monitor sensitive equipment in extreme environments. Her research has contributed to several different technologies, including drug detection, corrosion monitoring and combating food spoilage. She has worked with the Home Office and Smiths Group. In 2007 Sun co-founded Sengenia Ltd, a fibre sensing spin-out. She has developed humidity sensors that can withstand challenging environments such as acidic sewers in Sydney and rice stores in China. Sun continues to work with researchers at the Shandong Academy of Sciences on the implementation of optical fibres in the mining industry . In 2017 Sun was awarded the Australian Water Safety Council New South Wales Water Award to trial her sensors in Sydney Water. She is working with AECOM and Indian Institutes of Technology to enhance the sustainability of cities in India. This research was recognised with one of the most successful projects funded by the UK-India Education Research Initiative.

Sun designed a sensor system that could be used to measure strain and temperature in pantographs, the connectors that are used to link overhead power cables in for electric trains. These devices are essential for train function and routine checks can miss important information. The optical sensors developed by Sun can continuously monitor pantograph behaviour during operation. The instrumented pantographs developed by Sun are currently being developed by Brecknell Willis.

In 2018 Sun was awarded a Royal Academy of Engineering Research Chair to work with Brecknell Willis on new railway electrification systems. Sun is working on contactless electrification systems that integrate optical fibre sensors for continuous, in situ all-weather monitoring. The first pantographs went on service trial in 2019 and included Global Positioning System and video equipment. In 2019 they were awarded funding from the Railway Industry Association, Rail Safety and Standards Board and Innovate UK. Sun was shortlisted for the Times Higher Education Research Supervisor of the Year.

=== Awards and honours ===
Her awards and honours include;

- 2008 Elected Fellow of the Institution of Engineering and Technology
- 2016 Royal Academy of Engineering Silver Medal
- 2018 Order of the British Empire for services to engineering
- 2020 Elected Fellow of the Royal Academy of Engineering

=== Selective publications ===
Her publications include;

- Sun, Tong (15 May 2000). "Fiber optic sensor technology: an overview". Sensors and Actuators A: Physical. 82 (1–3): 40–61. Bibcode:2000SeAcA..82...40G. doi:10.1016/S0924-4247(99)00368-4.
- Sun, Tong (15 August 2008). "Fibre-optic sensor technologies for humidity and moisture measurement" (PDF). Sensors and Actuators A: Physical. 144 (2): 280–295. Bibcode:2008SeAcA.144..280Y. doi:10.1016/j.sna.2008.01.017.
- Sun, Tong (1 May 2014). "Gold nanorod-based localized surface plasmon resonance biosensors: A review" (PDF). Sensors and Actuators B: Chemical. 195: 332–351. Bibcode:2014SeAcB.195..332C. doi:10.1016/j.snb.2014.01.056.
