= Gymnasium Eppendorf =

Location
- Hegestraße 35; Hamburg, 20249; Germany
- Coordinates: 53°35′6″N 9°59′2″E

Information
- Established: 1904
- Principal: Dr. Maike Languth
- Website: gymnasium-eppendorf.de

The Gymnasium Eppendorf is a grammar school in Hamburg, Germany, established in 1904.

== History ==
The school was established in 1904 as a school for boys, Realschule in Eppendorf, in new buildings erected on the corner of Hegestraße and Hegestieg. Seven years later, it was renamed Oberrealschule Eppendorf, and in 1938 it was renamed Oberschule für Jungen in Eppendorf, and in 1957 Gymnasium für Jungen in Eppendorf. In 1969, it had female teaching staff for the first time, and in 1971 it turned coeducational and was given its current name.

From 1973 to 1974, John Dunston was an English language assistant at the school.

In 2000, the organisation Hegemalige e.V. was founded for former students and teaching staff of the school.

== Notable alumni ==
- Dirk Bielefeldt
- Christoph M. Ohrt
- Peter Tamm
- Ernst Uhrlau

== See also ==
- Heiner Eggert, 100 Jahre Gymnasium Eppendorf 1904-2004 : Die Schule, der Stadtteil, die Menschen, Hamburg, Germany, Publisher: Schulverein Gymnasium Eppendorf e. V., ISBN 978-3-00-013557-6
