= Farmington Institute =

Christian Institution

Coordinates: 51.756°N 1.252°W

Logo of the Farmington Institute

The Farmington Institute is based at Harris Manchester College, a constituent college of the University of Oxford in the United Kingdom. Sir Ralph Waller is director of the Farmington Institute. The institute's aim is to support, encourage and improve Christian education in schools, colleges and universities.

== Origin of the Institute ==
The Farmington Institute was founded by the late Hon. Robert 'Bobby' Wills, a member of the West Country tobacco family W.D. & H.O. Wills, to support, encourage and improve Christian education in schools, colleges and universities. The idea for founding the institute came to him during the World War II, when he was serving with the Grenadier Guards. He decided that if he survived the war he would do something to make the world a better place. Although severely wounded, he did survive, and so set up the institute.

== Aims of the institute ==
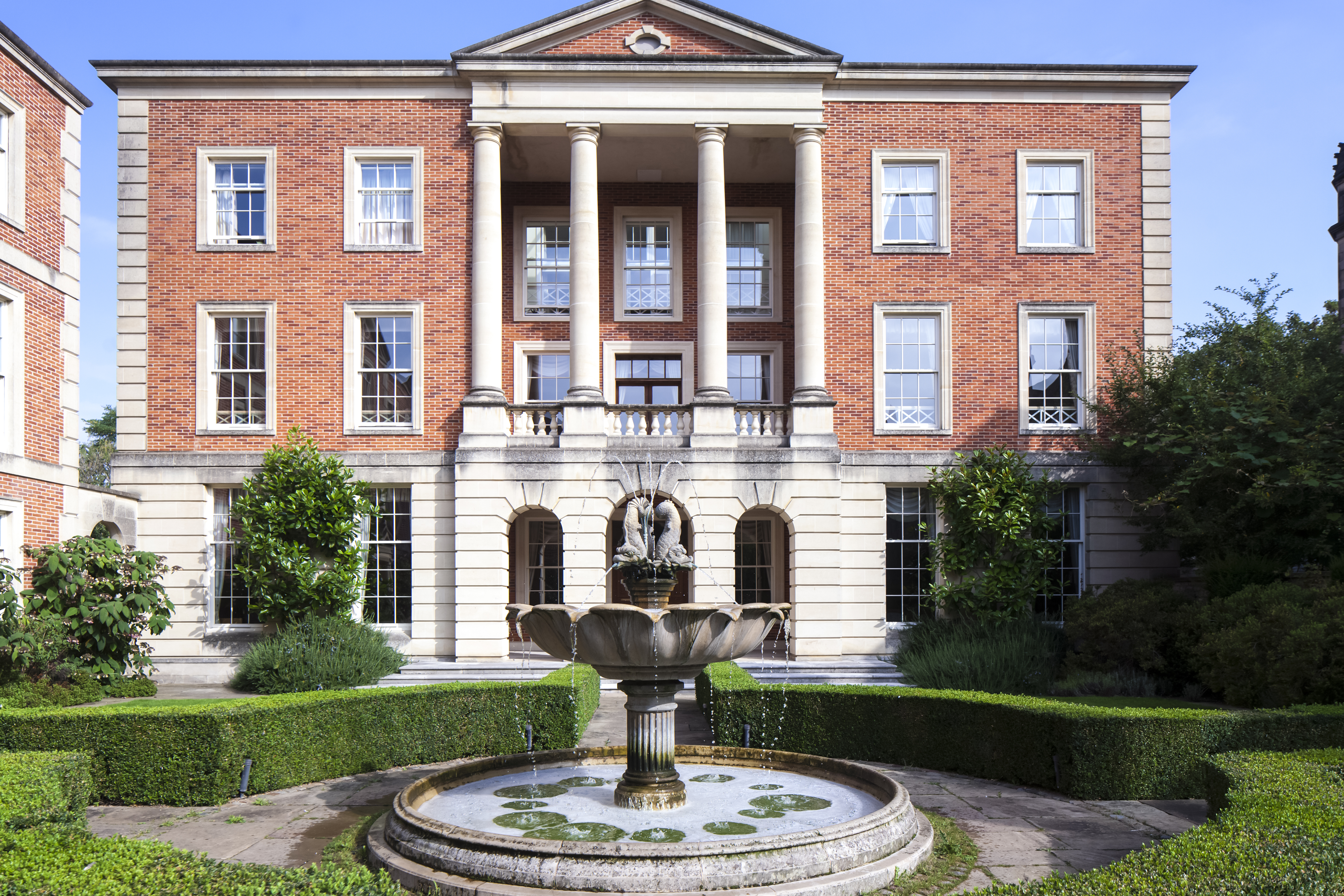
The Farmington Building at Harris Manchester College

Originally the institute was instrumental in setting up regional religious education (RE) resource centres and organising conferences for teachers of religious education. Wills then decided to offer Farmington Fellowships, a form of educational scholarship, which allowed teachers of religious education to have a term out of school giving them time to research a relevant topic at a university. The institute pays for all incidental expenses, including providing a replacement teacher in the Fellow's school. The Farmington Fellows present the results of their researches in an annual summer conference which is held in Oxford at Harris Manchester College.

Having been awarded Millennium Grants in 1997 and 2000, the institute is now able to offer Farmington Fellowships to primary and secondary school teachers of religious education, teachers of RE to children with special educational needs, as well as headteachers. The institute also gives Fellowships to the British Armed Forces to undertake research into moral and ethical leadership. The Farmington Papers, provided free to members of the institute, are aimed at RE teachers and others interested in theological and religious subjects. Conferences and seminars are arranged periodically.

The institute is ecumenical in its Christian outlook and takes a particular interest in developing good relationships with other world religions.
