= Ralph Waller =

The Reverend Sir Ralph Waller KBE

Personal details
- Born: 11 December 1945 (age 80)
- Spouse: Carol Roberts (married in 1968)
- Education: University of London; University of Nottingham; King's College London

Sir Ralph Waller KBE (born 11 December 1945) is Director of the Farmington Headteachers Institute at Jesus College, Cambridge, the former Principal of Harris Manchester College, Oxford (1988-2018) and a Pro-Vice-Chancellor of the University of Oxford (2010-2018). He is a British Methodist Minister.

Ralph Waller was born in Lincolnshire and educated at the University of London (BD), the University of Nottingham (MTh) and King's College London (PhD).

In 1994 he was awarded the UK Templeton Prize for progress in religion. He has been awarded honorary doctorates from universities in the United States, Europe and Great Britain, including a Doctor of Divinity from the University of Wales, a Doctor of Theology from Uppsala University and a Doctor of Education from Liverpool Hope University.

He is the MacWilliams Fellow in Divinity in the University of Wales, Trinity St David. He is a trustee of several charitable trusts, including the Thrombosis Research Institute, MGC Futures and the Ely Cathedral Trust. He is a former Chair of the Kalisher Trust and now a member of the Senior Kalisher Counsel. He is the Chair of the Westminster College Trust and Vice-Chair of the governors of Harris Westminster Sixth Form Academy. He is an ecumenical canon of Christ Church Cathedral, Oxford and of Ely Cathedral.

Ralph Waller is an Honorary Fellow of Homerton College, Cambridge, and an Emeritus Fellow of Harris Manchester College, Oxford.

He was knighted in the Queen's Birthday Honours of 2018 for services to education.

== Publications ==
- Ralph Waller and Benedicta Ward, eds, An introduction to Christian spirituality (London: SPCK, 1999)
- Benedicta Ward and Ralph Waller, eds, Joy of heaven: springs of Christian spirituality (London: SPCK, 2003)
- Ralph Waller, John Wesley: a personal portrait (London: SPCK, 2003)

== Sources and further information ==
- Harris Manchester College, Oxford
- Senate House Library
- University Sermon: John Wesley
- Oxford Blueprint
- Hartwick College Annual Honors Convocation
