= Dirk Bielefeldt =

German comedian

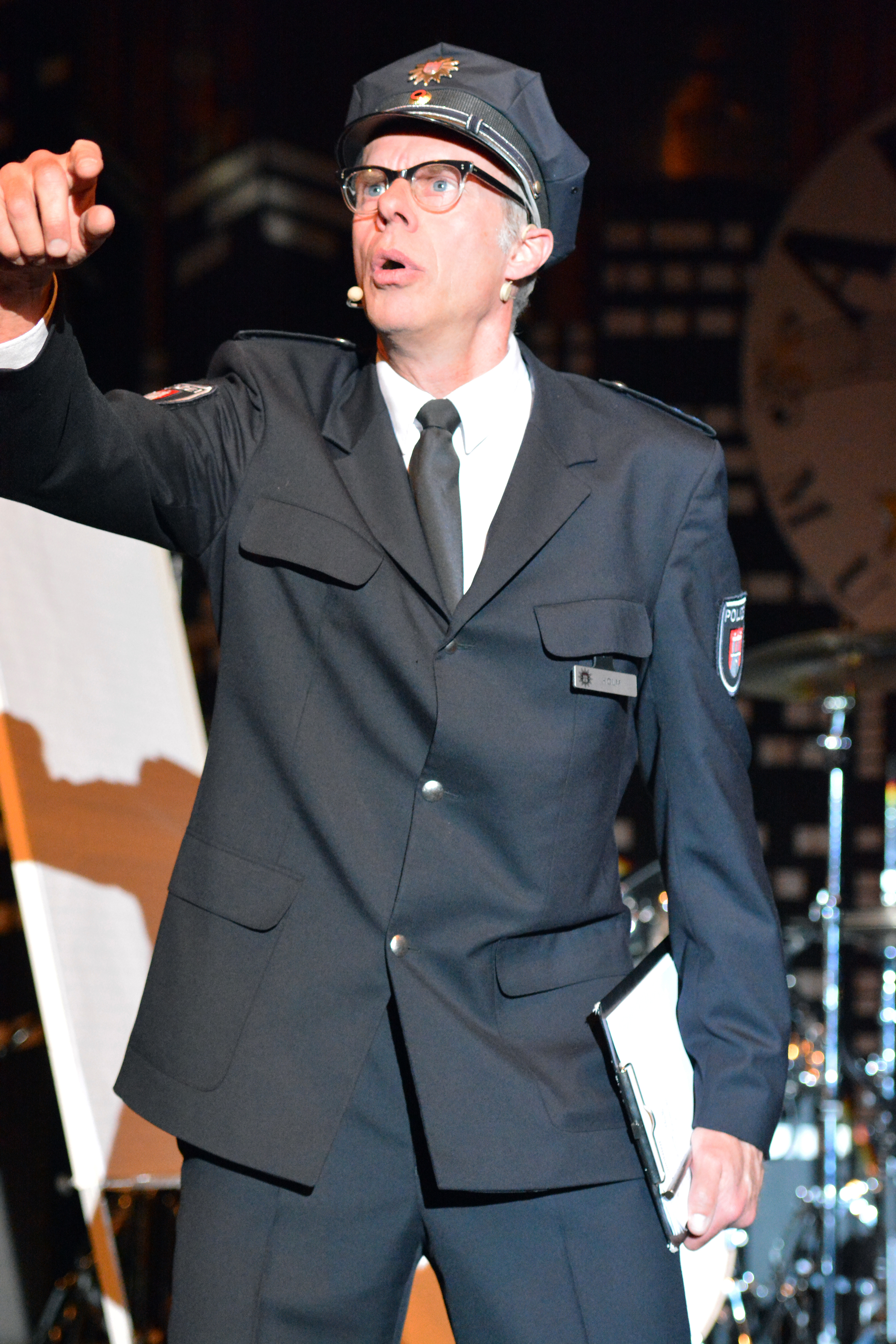
- Dirk Bielefeldt in 2014
- Born: 1957; Hamburg, West Germany
- Occupation(s): Cabaret artist and actor
- Known for: Herr Holm

Dirk Bielefeldt (born 1957 in Hamburg) is a German actor and cabaret artist, particularly famous for his role of the policeman, Herr Holm.

== Early life ==
Bielefeldt completed his abitur in 1976 in Gymnasium Eppendorf in Hamburg, before studying sociology and psychology at the University of Hamburg, financing his studies by working for a company which refurbished apartments, but not completing the course.

Bielefeldt then took an acting course with Philippe Gaulier in Paris, and participated in various street theatre groups, where he developed the character Herr Holm.

== Career ==
In 1991, Bielefeldt debuted in the cabaret production Herr Holm – Keiner für alle.

Soon afterwards, Bielefeldt was a partner of Peer Augustinski in the series Comedy Club, mostly playing Herr Holm, but also appearing as the caretaker Mock. The series only ran for a short time, but excerpts from it are still broadcast, adding to the popularity of Bielefeldt and Herr Holm. Bielefeldt also appeared in multiple stage productions, and in 2006 he appeared as a policeman in the film 7 Zwerge – Der Wald ist nicht genug.

Herr Holm's given name is Klaus-Dieter, but he is almost always referred to as Herr Holm.

Since 2009, Bielefeldt plays Herr Holm as a foreman instead of as a policeman in Vorsicht Baustelle!.

== Awards ==
- 1991 – ScharfrichterBeil Bavarian cabaret award
- 2007 – Honorary superintendent of the Hamburg police (German: Ehrenkommissar der Polizei Hamburg)
