= Ethel Quayle =

British clinical psychologist

Ethel Quayle is British clinical psychologist (but is no longer in practice). She is Personal Chair of Forensic Clinical Psychology at the University of Edinburgh. She researches sexual crimes against children, particularly sexual offenses involving the internet.

== Biography ==
Quayle has worked with both sexual offenders and their victims. She has spent 20 years researching crimes against children involving technology. Her work has involved creating a therapeutic treatment program for internet sexual offenders and an online self-help program for sexual offenders.

Her research has helped influence global policy to deter internet sexual offending. She has collaborated with governmental and non-governmental organizations.

== Works ==
- Terrorist Lives with Maxwell Taylor. Brassey's, 1995.
- Child Pornography: An Internet Crime with Max Taylor. 2003.
- Viewing child pornography on the Internet: Understanding the offence, managing the offender, helping the victims. Russell House Publishing, 2005.
- Only pictures?: Therapeutic work with internet sex offenders. Russell House Publishing, 2006.
- Understanding and Preventing Online Sexual Exploitation of Children. Routledge, 2012.
