= Paul Litchfield =

British physician

Paul Litchfield CBE FRCP FFOM is a British physician who was Chief Medical Officer for BT Group plc from 2001 to 2018. He reviewed the Work Capability Assessment run by Atos for the Department for Work and Pensions in 2013 and 2014 and he is an advisor to the UK government on the relationship between mental ill-health, absence from work and the take up of out-of-work sickness benefits.

== Education ==
Litchfield studied clinical sciences at St Andrew's University in Scotland before moving to Manchester University for his undergraduate clinical training. He graduated with a degree in medicine in 1977.

== Career ==
Litchfield joined the Royal Navy shortly after graduation. He served at sea and ashore for three years as a junior officer and then began training in his chosen field of occupational medicine based at the Institute of Naval Medicine in Gosport. In 1982, he studied for a higher degree in occupational health at the London School of Hygiene & Tropical Medicine. When he was fully trained, he worked in a dockyard environment as the Medical Officer of Health. In 1994, Litchfield retired from the navy at the age of 40 in the rank of Surgeon Commander.

On leaving the Forces, Litchfield worked for two years in a senior medical position in the Civil Service before moving to the private medical company BMI Healthcare, where he worked as Clinical Development Director until 2000.

In 2001, he was made Chief Medical Officer at BT. Litchfield is one of the architects of BT's Work Fit programme, which uses "multiple communication channels" to promote beneficial lifestyle changes, such as encouraging healthy eating and exercise to tackle the problem of obesity in sedentary office workers.

For just under four months in 2006, BT ran a mental health promotion campaign called 'Positive Mentality' in which employees were given information on how to "stave off" mental illness by eating different types of food, exercising and learning to relax. Litchfield has claimed that the early years of his tenure at BT coincided with a 30% reduction in mental health sickness absence and an 80% reduction in the firm's rate of medical retirement on the grounds of chronic mental illness.

Litchfield chaired the Faculty's ethical committee between 2007 and 2013. He co-edited Ethics Guidance for Occupational Health Practice in 2012.

In 2006, Litchfield was a member of the DWP's Mental Health Technical Working Group, which was set up to design a new mental health assessment for Incapacity Benefit claimants that would "identify accurately those who in spite of their condition are fit to continue in work". This work shaped the criteria used to gauge mental function in the Work Capability Assessment (WCA) that was introduced in 2008.

In 2009, he co-wrote a report on mental health and the workplace for the DWP. It focussed on the beneficial aspects of work for some people with a mental health condition and it highlighted the large and growing proportion of people on out-of-work benefits whose primary diagnosis was some form of mental illness.

In July 2010, he attended a seminar with the Minister for Welfare Reform and the Minister for Disabled People to discuss the department's strategy on mental health and welfare reform.

In 2013, DWP ministers chose Litchfield to review the performance of the WCA. The assessment was controversial because it was generating large numbers of fit-for-work findings that were subsequently disregarded by DWP decision-makers or overturned by independent tribunals. In the first year of Litchfield's tenure, all healthcare professionals previously approved to carry out the WCA – more than a thousand in total – had to be retrained yet the success rate at appeal rose to 52%. In the second year, Atos, the outsourcing company responsible for the core assessment, disclosed to the Financial Times that it would be ending its contract with the DWP prematurely, citing the company's opinion that the WCA was "not working" as one of its reasons for leaving.

In May 2014, Litchfield appeared before Parliament's Work and Pensions Select Committee to explain the problems with the WCA. By the summer, more than 700,000 people were waiting an average of 9 months for their WCA, because of bottlenecks in the system caused by long assessments (lasting well over an hour) and a shortage of healthcare professionals willing to carry them out.

In 2015, the Conservative Secretary of State for Work and Pensions criticised the WCA, which was introduced when Gordon Brown was Prime Minister. He called the test "unbelievably harsh", said it contained "perverse incentives" for claimants and lamented the fact that doctors were offered only a "binary choice" when asked for their opinion on fitness for work. Litchfield's professional opinion, as expressed to Parliament, was that the test was "by no means perfect" but nevertheless adequate.

== Other appointments ==
Litchfield is Chair of the What Works Centre for Wellbeing – an independent organisation that promotes evidence-based policy to improve wellbeing.

He is a member of 'Fit for Work UK'.

== Awards and honours ==
He was awarded the OBE in 2007. In 2018 he was created a CBE for services to workplace wellbeing.
