= Raulo Cáceres =

Spanish comics artist (born 1976)

Francisco Raúl Cáceres Anillo
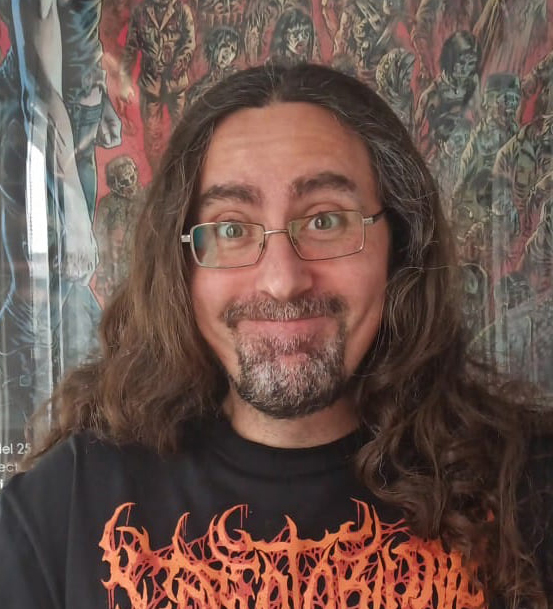
- Born: February 20, 1976 (age 50) Cordoba, Spain
- Area: Artist
- Pseudonym: Raúlo
- Notable works: Crécy; Gravel

Francisco Raúl Cáceres Anillo (born February 20, 1976), usually credited as Raulo Cáceres, is a Spanish comic artist. He is best known for his work at Avatar Press, in particular providing art for titles by Warren Ellis.

== Biography ==
He studied Fine Arts in Sevilla and Granada and, starting in the early 1990s, he has been published in a number of local fanzines.

In Spain his best known work is the horror comic Elizabeth Bathory, reprinted by Eros Comix, who have also published his Morbid Tales and a reworking of de Sade's Justine and Juliette.

He started his American career in 2007 with Avatar Press, with Warren Ellis on Gravel, Crécy and Captain Swing and the Electrical Pirates of Cindery Island, then on the franchise Crossed with various writers. He's currently working with Max Brooks on The Extinction Parade.

== Bibliography ==
=== Comics ===
Comic work includes:

- Elizabeth Bathory (in Wetcomix, 1999, republished by Eros Comix, 2002–2007)
- Justine y Juliette (in Wetcomix, republished by Eros Comix, 140 pages, 2005, ISBN 1-56097-645-4)
- Morbid Tales (Eros Comix, 2004)
- Belladonna (with Brian Pulido, Avatar Press, 2007)
- 2001 Maniacs Hornbook (with Mike Wolfer, Avatar Press, July, 2007)
- Crécy (with Warren Ellis, graphic novel, Avatar Press, 2007)
- Gravel (with Warren Ellis/Mike Wolfer, mini-series, Avatar Press, 2007–2008)
- Lady Death Swimsuit 2007 (with various artists, one-shot, Avatar Press, December 2007)
- Captain Swing and the Electrical Pirates of Cindery Island (with Warren Ellis, miniseries, Avatar Press, 2010–2011)
- Crossed: Psychopath (with David Lapham, miniseries, Avatar Press, 2011)
- Crossed: Badlands #19-20 (with Simon Spurrier) (2012), #25-28 (with Garth Ennis) (2013), Avatar Press
- The Extinction Parade (with Max Brooks, miniseries, Avatar Press, 2013–2014)

=== Covers ===
He has also provided covers for other comic books including:

- Doktor Sleepless #1-13 (2007–2009)
- Crossed: Badlands (2012–present)
