= Apparat Singles Group =

Fictional comic book line created by Warren Ellis

- Created by: Warren Ellis

Publication information
- Publisher: Avatar Press
Title(s)
Angel Stomp Future
Frank Ironwine
Quit City
Simon Spector
- Formats: Original material for the series has been published as a set of one-shot comics.
- Publication date: November – December 2004
- Number of issues: 4

Creative team
- Artist(s): Juan Jose Ryp (Angel Stomp Future); Carla Speed McNeil (Frank Ironwine); Laurenn McCubbin (Quit City); Jacen Burrows (Simon Spector)
- Colorist(s): Greg Waller (Frank Ironwine & Simon Spector)
- Editor(s): William A. Christensen

Reprints
- Collected editions
- Apparat: The Singles Collection: ISBN 1-59291-032-7

"Apparat Singles Group", a.k.a. "Apparat", is a fictional comic book line and a label used to publish four one-shot comic books created by Warren Ellis and published by Avatar Press.

== Publication history ==
The premise behind the line was that each one-shot represented a first issue of a comic published in an alternate reality where pulp stories made a direct transition into comics without spawning superhero comics. Each one-shot came with an essay explaining the premise of the label and a detailed behind-the-scenes explanation for the ideas that led to the creation of each comic. To help maintain the premise, each one-shot had an Apparat label, with the Avatar Press label appearing only on back covers.

== Titles ==
=== Angel Stomp Future ===
Genre: Science fiction

Doctor Angel Antimony takes the reader on a tour of her very weird future. Rampant body modification, black comedy and memetics fill out the pages.

=== Frank Ironwine ===
Genre: Detective

Frank Ironwine is a middle-aged homicide detective with a low-key investigative style, focusing on character and motivation instead of forensics.

=== Quit City ===
Genre: Aviator adventure

The story follows a woman pilot who dropped out of the Aeropiratika group of adventurers and returned home to San Francisco, where she deals with the unfinished business from her past.

=== Simon Spector ===
Genre: Pulp vigilantes

Modeled after Doc Savage and The Shadow, Simon Spector is a wealthy man who apparently lives in a skyscraper in Manhattan. He has been trained to kill barehanded and makes use of drugs which make him "super-sane" with advanced cognitive abilities, at the cost of cutting his life expectancy with each dose.

== Collected editions ==
The four one-shots have been collected into a trade paperback:

- Apparat: The Singles Collection (112 pages, January 2006, ISBN 1-59291-032-7)

== Imprint ==
Warren Ellis has recently announced plans to return to Apparat label to publish the original graphic novellas Crécy, Aetheric Mechanics, Frankenstein's Womb, and the ongoing monthly Doktor Sleepless.
