= The Secret Saturdays: Beasts of the 5th Sun =

2009 video game

- Developers: High Voltage Software (PSP, PS2, Wii); 1st Playable Productions (DS)
- Publisher: D3 Publisher
- Composer: Michael Tavera
- Engine: Quantum3
- Platforms: Nintendo DS; PlayStation 2 PlayStation Portable; Wii
- Release: NA: October 20, 2009; EU: November 20, 2009; AU: April 12, 2010 (DS, Wii)
- Genre: Action
- Mode: Single-player

The Secret Saturdays: Beasts of the 5th Sun is an action video game developed by High Voltage Software and 1st Playable Productions and released in 2009 for the Nintendo DS, PlayStation 2, PlayStation Portable, and Wii consoles. The game is based on the Cartoon Network animated television series The Secret Saturdays created by Jay Stephens.

== Plot ==
The game begins as Zak and Fiskerton are watching Weird World, where V.V. Argost talks about the Aztec's belief that there have been four suns in the past, with the fifth one being the current. Subsequently, Zak and his family foil Argost's attempted robbery of a facility to get information about cryptids such as the Adaro. Next, the family locates eight cryptid-attracting totems around the world. After fighting off more men with the help of an Orange-Eyes and using Fiskerton to navigate difficult terrain, Argost kidnaps the Orange-Eyes. Zak tries to catch up with Argost on Zon but to no avail.

Back at the airship, Zak tries to convince his parents to go after Argost and the Orange Eyes, but Doc states that they have to beat Argost to the other cryptids he's after. Doc states that he has manage to retrieve more data from what Van Rook stole and they all fall into 8 Geographic locals. This makes Zak believe this has something to do with the Sun of the 8 Beasts and they move on to the nearest area in the pattern. At an active volcano where the next beast, the burning man, is supposed to live, Doc and Drew tell Zak to stay put, but he goes in after Pietro "Piecemeal" Maltese scares off Fiskerton and Komodo. After fighting through the Cryptids in the volcano and Piecemeal, the volcano is about to erupt with Piecemeal stealing the Burning Man apparently with the intention of eating him. Zak must run away with Zon.

Zak studies Argost's ramblings from the intro and spots the Azazel, a goat-like cryptid. The family goes to Egypt to pick it up, and protect it from the Blemyah. Next, the Saturday family goes to China. Drew and Doc get caught up in studying the nearby temple and leave Zak to look for the Wampus cat. Zon, Fiskerton, and Komodo are once again put under the spell of a totem until Drew breaks them out of it. After Doyle and Zak free the cat, Doc comes in to pick it up.

Next the team arrive in an underwater city. Doc believes they have arrived first because there is no structural damage aside from salt water erosion. Through the use of a Morgawr and Orobon, they find the Con-Rit (one of the 8 Beasts). Munya arrives on the scene and Zak uses the Con-rit to beat Munya. Doc analyzes a section of the Con-Rit's armor while Zak reveals that he swiped Munya's list of cryptids, which only lists seven of the eight beasts. The only one left to go being a Kikiyaon with the word "Finster" mentioned, which Zak suggests refers to Baron Finster. Doyle states that if Finster does have the Kikiyaon, then it is in a research lab in the desert.

The Family goes back to base only to see Argost getting away with the Cryptids they rescued. They know Argost will be after the final Cryptid and suspect that it is in an Aztec temple. After fighting his way to the temple, Drew realizes too late that it is a trap. Argost locks Zak in an Aztec booby trap, takes his claw, and releases him into a cryptid-infested jungle.

The family storms Weird World in a last-ditch effort to rescue the kidnapped Cryptids and Zak's claw. However, due to a booby trap triggered by Fiskerton, Zak is separated from his family. He finally gets the Claw back just in time for a fight with Argost, which reveals that he has already concentrated the seven cryptid's powers into a large sun-like sphere. Zak is eventually able to defeat Argost, but triggers a booby trap that adds the claw's power to the seven cryptids. Zak and Doyle are able to retrieve the claw before the sun sphere detonates and everyone is ejected from the mansion via another booby trap. The game ends with Argost optimistically stating that tomorrow is another Apocalypse.

== Cast ==
- Sam Lerner - Zak Saturday
- Phil Morris - Solomon "Doc" Saturday
- Nicole Sullivan - Drew Saturday
- Diedrich Bader - Fiskerton
- Fred Tatasciore - Komodo, Munya, Zon
- Corey Burton - V.V. Argost, Leonidas Van Rook
- Will Friedle - Doyle Blackwell

== Reception ==
Reception

Aggregate score
Aggregator	Score			
Aggregator	DS	PS2	PSP	Wii
Metacritic	60/100	47/100	75/100	60/100

Review scores
Publication	Score			
Publication	DS	PS2	PSP	Wii
GamesRadar+	3.5/5	2/5	N/A	N/A
GameZone	6.1/10	N/A	7.5/10	7.8/10
Nintendo World Report	5/10	N/A	N/A	6.5/10

The PSP version received "generally favorable reviews", and the DS and Wii versions received "mixed" reviews, while the PlayStation 2 version received "generally unfavorable reviews", according to the review aggregation website Metacritic.
