= Wolfskin (comics) =

2006–2007 comic book limited series

- Variant painted cover to Wolfskin Annual #1. Art by Felipe Massafera.

Publication information
- Publisher: Avatar Press
- Schedule: Monthly
- Format: Limited series
- Genre: Fantasy
- Publication date: April 2006 – March 2007
- No. of issues: 3 + 1 Annual

Creative team
- Written by: Warren Ellis
- Artist: Juan Jose Ryp
- Colorist: Andrew Dalhouse
- Editor: William A. Christensen

Collected editions
- Hardcover: ISBN 1-59291-077-7

Wolfskin is a three-issue limited series comic book, published 2006 and 2007 by Avatar Press. It is written by Warren Ellis, with art by Juan Jose Ryp. From 2010 to 2011, a second six-issue comic book limited series, titled Wolfskin: Hundredth Dream was published.

It is a fantasy comic combining sword and sorcery themes (like those in Conan) with elements from historical fantasy sources (including Norse sagas and chambara).

== Publication history ==
Ellis released Wolfskin Annual #1 with co-author Mike Wolfer and art by Gianluca Pagliarani. This set up the scene for a new six-issue Wolfskin limited series.

In 2010, Avatar Press began publishing a new 6-issue limited series titled Wolfskin: Hundredth Dream with story by Warren Ellis, script by Mike Wolfer, and art by Gianluca Pagliarani.

== Collected editions ==
The series has been collected into two trade paperbacks:

- Wolfskin Volume 1 (120 pages, limited edition hardcover, October 2009, ISBN 1-59291-077-7, softcover, ISBN 1-59291-076-9)
- Wolfskin Volume 2: Hundredth Dream (160 pages, softcover, ISBN 1-59291-138-2)
