= Streets of Glory =

Western comic book mini-series

Publication information
- Publisher: Avatar Press
- Schedule: Bimonthly
- Format: Limited series
- Genre: Western
- Publication date: October 2007 – October 2008
- No. of issues: 6

Creative team
- Created by: Garth Ennis; Mike Wolfer
- Written by: Garth Ennis
- Artist(s): Mike Wolfer
- Letterer(s): Mike Wolfer
- Colorist(s): Greg Waller
- Editor(s): William A. Christensen; Mark Seifert

Collected editions
- Hardcover: ISBN 1-59291-065-3

Streets of Glory is a 6-issue western comic book mini-series written by Garth Ennis and illustrated by Mike Wolfer. It was published by Avatar Press, and the first issue was released in September 2007.

== Collected editions ==
The series has been collected into a single volume:

- Streets of Glory (160 pages, softcover, February 2009, ISBN 1-59291-064-5, hardcover, March 2009, ISBN 1-59291-065-3)
