= Über (comics) =

Alternate history comic book series

- Variant cover for Über #23, art by Canaan White.

Publication information
- Publisher: Avatar Press
- Schedule: Monthly
- Format: Ongoing series
- Genre: Military science fiction
- Publication date: March 2013 - October 2018
- No. of issues: 47

Creative team
- Created by: Kieron Gillen
- Written by: Kieron Gillen
- Artist(s): Canaan White; Gabriel Andrade; Daniel Gete

Über is an alt-hist comic fiction series written by Kieron Gillen and illustrated by Caanan White, Gabriel Andrade and Daniel Gete. It was published monthly by Avatar Press, which released the first issue in April 2013. The comic depicts an alternate World War II in which the Third Reich develops powerful superhuman soldiers in 1945, preventing its imminent defeat and forcing the Allied nations to counter with superhumans of their own.

The series is notable for its extreme violence, its depiction of wartime moral ambiguity and its mixing of fictional and real historical characters. As of 2026 no new issues have been released for 8 years.

== Creation ==
Gillen began conducting background research for Über in 2008 after a discussion with Avatar Press publisher William A. Christensen, eventually compiling a 30,000-word "bible" of historical research to support the project. The writer stated the series' style was shaped "from how much WW2 still hangs over us even now, and watching the crowds thin in veteran's reunions", and felt considerable reading was necessary to do a "serious story" about World War II. Gillen also strived to emulate the style of historical detail used in war comics by Garth Ennis, as well as other British war comics including Johnny Red and particularly Charley's War. Other research included documentaries and the 1993 film Stalingrad. He explained the narrative was intended to function more as a "simulation" rather than using the tropes of heroic fiction works. In an interview with USA Today, Gillen stated:

"It doesn't matter if Spider-Man's fighting Galactus — Spider-Man will find a way to beat Galactus. Uber isn't that story. Uber is the story that every single time, Galactus will kill Spider-Man"

He also carefully gauged the powers of the Übers in order to fictionally prolong World War II rather than resolving it with a Nazi victory.

For the superhumans' Distortion Halo — a powerful eye beam — Gillen drew on a first aid course about the treatment of gunshot wounds to create a power that was "its own thing". He was sensitive to criticism that the series was overly sympathetic to Nazi characters, using a panel at the 2013 New York Comic Con to observe that Über was "about humans doing horrible things. I want to write about my opinion of the truth of the war." and that he was "not saying everyone's equally bad. I'm not. I'm saying everyone's pretty awful."

== Publication history ==
=== Über ===
Gillen envisioned a series of between 30 and 60 issues, broken up into plot arcs by different phases and theatres of the fictional continued war. The series began with a 48-page "zero" issue in April 2013. Über #0 rapidly sold out, and Avatar produced a second print featuring additional pages, as Über #0 - Enhanced Edition in May, limited to 7,500 copies The series featured mini-essays in each issue, providing context and commentary from Gillen. After the title's initial success, Christensen hoped it would run for the projected 60 issues.

Über ended on a cliffhanger after 29 issues in August 2015.

=== Specials ===
A spin-off title exploring the backstories of several major characters, Über Special #1, was published in March 2014. A free recap issue, entitled Über: The First Cycle, was published for Free Comic Book Day in May 2014, taking the format of illustrated prose pieces by Gillen, written as an oral history of the events of the first dozen issues.

=== Über: Invasion ===
The series was restarted as Über: Invasion a year later, creating a jump-on point for new readers. Invasion was to function as the second and final cycle of the story. As the name suggested, it shifted focus towards a Nazi incursion into the United States.

Avatar and Gillen created a Kickstarter campaign to fund the series, which swiftly doubled the original goal of $9,000. Asked if the series would ever be finished at the 2019 New York Comic Con, Gillen replied "Avatar is just trying to get their ducks in a row, but I am committed to finishing the story when it is possible to do it.". However, as of 2026 no new issues have been released for 8 years.

== Plot ==
A secret Nazi military research project has succeeded in creating Übermenschen ("Übers") – enhanced humans with extreme strength and durability, combined with the ability to generate a destructive energy field known as a "disruption halo" that can blast through most materials. These Nazi superhumans are divided into two classes – the basic "tank" class ("Panzermensch"), who number several hundred at the start of the series, and the "battleship" class, who are far more powerful but number only three. Only one human in 5,000 is viable for enhancement, with an even smaller number potentially capable of becoming "battleships". The German "battleships" – two male and a female – are code-named Siegmund, Siegfried, and Sieglinde, after characters in Richard Wagner's Ring cycle. While the basic Übers can be dispatched with well-placed anti-tank weaponry or a rifle round to the eye when using the halo, the "battleships" are invulnerable to most conventional weaponry, with only large-calibre naval weaponry speculated to be capable of destroying them. Their only significant weakness is the need to 'recharge' by sleeping, postponement of which can have dire consequences. Potential Übers are activated by a crystalline compound known as "Catalyst" that takes time to ferment; the process takes around 30 days per activation; while a standard Über will only take a single activation, a Battleship requires 24 activations.

=== 24 April - 9 June 1945 ===
The Red Army is nearing victory in the Battle of Berlin until General Sankt unveils a squadron of the Übers and a trio of Battleships. On April 29–30 Siegmund and his support forces devastate the 1st Ukrainian Front in the Battle of Beelitz, while Sieglinde begins wiping out the Soviet columns inside Berlin. Siegfried meanwhile routs the Belorussian Front troops outside the Reichstag, with the Panzermensch mopping up pockets of Red Army units. Around a million Soviets surrender, while most of their surviving troops withdraw from Berlin. News of the Wunderwaffe's success arrives at the Führerbunker seconds before Adolf Hitler commits suicide - albeit too late to save Eva Braun. He then orders Battleship Siegfried to massacre the Soviet prisoners, with the vast majority of the million men killed by his disruption halo or the resulting stampede. The display horrifies Heinz Guderian and Albert Speer, who are among the few high-ranking Nazis left. Guderian and Speer try to evaluate the tactical possibilities of the Übers in the hope it could force an armistice with the Allies. The USAAF attempts a mass daylight bombing raid on Berlin, but the aircraft are cut to pieces by Siegmund and Sieglinde; however, as the latter was approaching her refractory cycle she is badly strained by the effort required. Meanwhile Stephanie, a British Special Intelligence Service undercover agent at the Projekt U research facility steals important papers, sabotages catalyst production and is able to make her way back to England. She meets with Prime Minister Winston Churchill and outlines what she has discovered; he assigns her to use this knowledge to create British Tankmen at Bletchley Park, where it is soon discovered that the USAAF airman Patrick O'Connor is genetically suitable for Battleship activation. In Berlin, Sankt is summoned before Hitler; despite the success of the Übers the Führer is furious the project was kept from him, and has Sankt executed by Siegfried. Having expected such an event, Sankt has instructed his assistant Anita Scheele to take his notes on the Übers to Guderian. He and Scheer plan a three-pronged offensive - with Battleship Siegmund's group to continue routing the Soviets, Battleship Siegfried to break through to the oil fields at Ploiești, and Sieglinde to break through to Belgium, where a large number of Wehrmacht prisoners are held by the Allies. However, Hitler overrides the latter and instead sends Sieglinde to Paris to get retribution for the damage done to Berlin.

While progress is slower than expected due to tactical limitations, by 21 May Siegmund's battle group have pushed the Red Army back into East Prussia, while Battlegroup Siegfried is able to break through to Ploiești on 3 June. On 7 June, Sieglinde and her support group leave Berlin for Paris - with the Battleship using her distortion halo to create a bridge over the Rhine. Despite Stephanie's concerns over the readiness of O'Connor's (who takes the codename HMH Colossus, after the Bletchley Park computer) readiness, the Allied Tankmen are deployed to defend the French capital. The German force reaches Paris on 9 June; tactics devised by Field Marshall Bernard Montgomery allow the Allied Tankmen to perform well against the Panzermensch until Sieglinde enters the field. Colossus is sent to attack her directly; initially the battle is even until Sieglinde tears off both of his arms and then ruins his body with her distortion halo. The allied force crumbles, and most of Paris' landmarks are destroyed to deny them to the Germans, who withdraw after causing huge casualties - and leaving the Allies to euthanise Colossus with an industrial drill.

Meanwhile the Germans had also delivered a supply of catalyst to Japan, and on 24 May they deploy enhanced Kamikazes on the US Navy picket around Okinawa Island, sinking three destroyers. Next, they send enhanced Miyoko Warriors - including the battleship-class Hideki, named as Battleship Yamato. Despite only half of the transport planes landing successfully, the enhanced Japanese forces obliterate Yontan Airfield. The battle soon becomes cyclical - in daylight the naval support are able to provide artillery support that prevents the Miyoko from gaining a foothold; however, at night the ships are forced to withdraw to a safe distance after two capital ships are destroyed by enhanced troops, leaving the Japanese to carry out brutal attacks on American camps. The sole survivor of one such attack is Eammon 'Razor' O'Connor - brother of the late Patrick, and therefore a perfect candidate for Battleship activation.

=== 10 June - 1 July 1945 ===
Having received a shipment of catalyst from the British, Joseph Stalin eschews the lengthier blood tests used by other nations and has 420,000 convict soldiers exposed to raw catalyst to create 101 Tank Men. Eccentric sniper Maria "Katyusha" Andreevna, a survivor of the massacre in Berlin, also undergoes the process but doesn't show any of the expected qualities. By June 22, Battlegroup Siegmund reaches Kursk, where it is ambushed at close quarters by 90 Soviet Tank Men, triggering the Second Battle of Kursk. While outgunned by Siegmund and suffering heavy casualties, they are able to sever one of the Battleship's arms and send him fleeing. Weeks later, Maria's powers finally activate - including the ability to generate catalyst - but she walks out into the wilderness.

At Bletchley Park, Stephanie makes further experiments with help from Alan Turing, focusing on new subject Leah Cohen. While the new process makes Cohen incredibly powerful, it leaves her body grossly deformed. Meanwhile, Guderian decides the swiftest way to ease the pressure on the Western Front is a risky decapitation strike, and Sieglinde is launched to London onboard a V-2 rocket. The new British Heavy Tank Men are deployed to defend the War Rooms in Whitehall but only briefly stall the German Battleship. As Cohen is not combat ready, Churchill orders Stephanie not to field her and instead meets Sieglinde, who kills him - placing his head on top of Nelson's Column. While this is happening, Siegmund reveals his true identity as an embittered survivor of the Battle of Stalingrad in a private audience with Hitler, and uses his abilities to give the dictator a fatal heart-attack. Stephanie meanwhile deals with the psychological stress of the destruction in London and her own ethical compromises.

=== 2 July - 12 August 1945 ===
Maria has resurfaced at an isolated farmstead in Siberia, having developed the ability to turn ground into nourishment with her distortion halo. She kills Red Army forces sent to retrieve her, including a unit of Tank Men. As a result, Stalin orders a change of tactics following the death of Churchill, and instead of trying to capture her the army request her help against the advancing Germans. Meanwhile, the Nazi hierarchy deals with the impact of Hitler's death, only for him to appear alive. Sieglinde meanwhile reaches Southend-on-Sea for extraction; she is met by a formidable Royal Navy squadron. However, the Germans unveil their new Blitzmensch - enhanced troops with boosted disruption halos at the expense of physical attributes, a process referred to as "double-stacking". The Home Fleet suffers serious losses and an exhausted Sieglinde is successfully evacuated via Elektroboot. Leah meanwhile is given the name HMH Churchill, while research at Porton Down indicates potential catalyst stacking combinations - 6 activations can create what Stephanie names the Destroyer-class, and 12 activations for a Cruiser-class enhanced humans. The Blitzmensch are deployed to attack Atlantic convoys, causing massive shipping losses and cutting supplies to both Britain and the USSR. On land, elevated platforms are used to enable the line of sight Blitzmensch to be used on major cities, and Antwerp is devastated on July 8. Nazi development of Heavy Panzermensch provides enough ground support to negate Allied attempts to combat the fragile Blitzmensch, while also revealing the existence of a mole in Bletchley Park. To relieve pressure on the convoys, on 11 August British Tank Men undertake airborne assaults on the submarine pens in Hamburg and Kiel, destroying them. However, Montgomery reveals to Stephanie the expected source of the leak at Bletchley - enhanced spies.

=== 13 August - 13 September 1945 ===
America has also suffered heavily at the hands of the enhanced Geltsmench spies, one of whom sabotages the Atomic Bomb programme - firstly by taking the place of a crew member on the Enola Gay so that Little Boy failed to detonate when dropped on Hiroshima on 6 August, then destroying the research facilities at Hanford Site in a suicide attack. US intelligence struggles to pin down the chain of events, while Major General Leslie Groves oversees America's own enhancement programme - with Eamonn O'Conner as the Battleship USS Colossus and brothers Vernon and Freddie Rivers as the heavy cruisers USS Bluestone and USS Bravo. The latter are both suitable for Battleship enhancement, but as they are African Americans Higher Command decides to limit their power to avoid civil unrest. In Berlin, concerns are growing about the sustainability of German tactics with Sieglinde only recovering slowly and Siegmund injured. Meanwhile, Zhukov works with Maria on a Soviet counter-offensive; on 25 August she destroys the Übermensch stationed at Kursk easily, and Sieglinde and Siegfried are readied to face her. Siegmund is perplexed by Hitler's apparent continued life and lack of memory of their encounter; he has in fact been replaced by a Geltmensch. This is only a temporary measure; Joseph Goebbels plans to have Scheele use her halo abilities to sculpt his face to perfectly resemble that of Hitler. On 13 September, Sieglinde meets Maria in Kiev. The Soviet's range of unusual powers soon give her the advantage; fearing Sieglinde destroyed, command opts to withdraw Siegfried. In England, Stephanie discovers the spy while sleeping with him, believing him to be a British Tank Man. The spy is disabled by Turing, who has been activated as a Tank Man. She discovers that the Geltsmench use a form of hypnosis or telepathy for their disguises, which can be bypassed with cameras. Meanwhile Maria reaches the Bug River but decides to stop there, having only promised to drive the Germans out of the USSR. Sieglinde meanwhile is retrieved by the Germans, alive but heavily scarred. Goebbels meanwhile is able to take Hitler's place as planned, issuing a cover story that Goebbels was killed by Soviet assassins.

=== 14 September - 13 November 1945 ===
The Nazis advance through Europe destroying cities with a combined unit comprising most of their Über resources, and soon France is on the brink of surrender. The British begin preparing to deploy HMH Churchill, unaware that Stephanie has prematurely terminated her . Leah trains alongside the gallant HMH Dunkirk, a new Destroyer-Class Tankman, and Montgomery decides that they have no choice but to deploy her to Calais. Maria meanwhile demands her own unit of activated Russians to train, something Stalin has no choice but to agree to. At Okinawa, America is finally beginning to stem the flow of Japanese Miyoko reinforcements and deploy their own Tank Men into the theatre, breaking the stalemate. The remaining Japanese forces conduct suicide attacks while Battleship Yamato is withdrawn from the islands by submarine. On 30 October HMH Churchill and HMH Dunkirk are deployed to Calais, where hidden forces have already began attacking the bermensch approaching the city. However, the Germans use disguised Cruiser-class bers to draw the British forces into a trap, where they are fired on by an elevated Sieglinde. Leah's knee is ruined in the resulting battle, and she is only saved when Dunkirk throws her to safety before he is overwhelmed and killed, heralding the end of the battle Long-range Über attacks on the South of England commence, and a last ditch attempt to combat them with the Royal Navy fails. Britain surrenders on November 12, and Bletchley Park begins destroying material. Stephanie meanwhile escapes along with Turing and the crippled Leah, taking some research with them. The Germans also try to take out the leadership of the US Army in Europe with a Geltsmench; this is only a partial success as General George S. Patton is a Tank Man and survives the attack. However, off the coast of Boston a fleet of U-Boats arrive, carrying an Über invasion force.

=== 14 November 1945 - 1946 ===
Coordinated German forces swiftly take Naval Auxiliary Air Facility Otis, and use the planes to attack Fore River Shipyard and the Bethlehem Hingham Shipyard. US intelligence incorrectly believes both Siegfried and Siegmund are deployed in Europe; however, the former devastates Boston from the air. News reaches the White House ten minutes later, shortly before the building is warped into a grotesque Swastika by Übers, killing President Harry S. Truman. Groves shows Colossus, Bravo and Bluestone the remains of Boston and gives them their brief - to hunt down the German forces. While a force of 300 American Tank Men tracks Siegfried's unit, under the command of Guderian, to Naugatuck State Forest on 19 November, the close presence of Siegmund wins out over the numerical advantage and most of the Americans are killed. America offers an armistice, which 'Hitler' refuses, believing the United States are an existential threat to Nazi Germany. In Boston, Stephanie and Alan arrive. They have discovered a young British girl called Tamara with battleship potential. With both German Battleships elsewhere, American Tank Men locate and annihilate the Southern German force on 21 November near Philadelphia. Stephanie and Alan compare notes with Groves and begin putting their theories into practice on the American programme. However, in the meantime the German Battleships level New York, while Battleship Yamato is unexpectedly deployed to San Diego, causing huge devastation. The lone Japanese Battleship is almost impossible for the Americans to track, but Bravo and Bluestone are deployed to hunt him down while Colossus is held as a war of attrition sets in with the German invasion force. In Southern France, Patton prepares his forces to cross the Alps to more defensible positions in Italy. On 26 December the Americans prepare for battle West of Monroe in an attempt to curb a German strike towards Detroit. Colossus is used to draw Siegfried into close combat, at which point the new Zephyr-class enhanced American troops devised by Stephanie and Alan are deployed. These have incredibly boosted speed at the expense of durability. While all five Zephyrs are lost in the battle they are able to slit Siegfried's throat with diamond daggers, eventually killing him.

In Siberia, Maria is running an iconoclastic survival camp to train potential Soviet battleships. While she continues to supply the USSR with catalyst, high command continues to tire of her idiosyncrasies and independence, and is plotting against her with the recruits. One working for the regime is Oleysa, who is finally able to replicate Maria's transmutation skills after a brutal exercise. HMH Churchill and Tamara arrive in Genoa and link up with Patton's forces north of Milan. They begin activating Tamara as HMH Britannia, while Patton devises a novel catapult tactic that allows HMH Churchill to be hurled at the Cruisers Gunther and Gutrune; she defeats both easily once in range, avenging HMH Dunkirk's death in Calais. Gutrune is killed while the crippled Gunter is captured by American forces, while the engagement stops the German advance. Bluestone and Bravo have tracked Yamato to an internment camp near San Francisco, but query orders to liquidate the entire camp, giving the Japanese battleship a chance to escape. After the loss of Siegfried, the remaining German forces turn away from Detroit and towards Chicago, and realise that further Zephyrs are a month away from activation. To stem their approach, Groves prepares the atomic bomb Fat Man for use against Siegmund. The Americans prepare a plan involving Colossus as bait to lure Siegmund towards the bomb near Oak Ridge on 29 January. However, the plan is complicated when Siegmund tells Colossus he wants to defect, but badly injures the American in the resulting misunderstanding. Nevertheless Colossus is able to get them both clear of the atomic blast. After the loss of Siegmund, Guderian commits suicide, and the bulk of the remaining German force surrenders. Yamato meanwhile has been withdrawn unseen via submarine. After realising this, Groves declares the invasion of America over.

With German resources dwindling, 'Hitler' puts his faith in Project Götterdämmerung. Sieglinde is redeployed to the Eastern Front, joined by Battleship Zero - an experimental, animalistic leftover of the German test programme that finds affinity with Sieglinde. Speer meanwhile orders Scheele's tongue and hands removed after finding her suggesting surrender to Sieglinde; her halo skills make her too important to be killed. Interrogated by Stephanie, Siegmund reveals his apparent assassination of Hitler before travelling to Italy to meet up with Patton's force. Maria meanwhile meets Sieglinde at Minsk but is defeated by Battleship Zero and forced to retreat, while Yamato is fielded on the Manchurian front. With the Germans advancing, defences are hurriedly constructed outside of Moscow, while HMH Churchill is sent to support Maria. The German force successfully counters an attempted deployment of Russian Zephyrs at Smolensk, and continues to advance on the Soviet capital. However, Zero is easily countered by HMH Churchill, and Maria is able to drive Sieglinde into retreat. She then takes her students to Eastern Russia and heavily injures Yamato at Irkutsk. With the invasion threat gone, Oleysa and the other students turn on Maria. Her body is transported back to Moscow for dissection; however, Maria survived the betrayal and on arrival kills Oleysa and destroys the Kremlin before turning Stalin into solid catalyst. Maria declares that the USSR is now an anarchy, and while she will drive back any further invasions neither she nor the country will play any further part in the war. As a parting gesture, she repairs HMH Churchill's ruined knee. Meanwhile Groves plans a strike to knock Japan out of the war. Operation Debutante involves dropping Bravo, Bluestone and Siegmund into Japan, ostensibly to kidnap Hirohito. However, an assault on Tokyo is actually a ruse to dispose of both the capital and Siegmund, as the Americans know the Japanese have Little Boy set up in the city as a final resort. The bomb detonates, horribly injuring Siegmund. Bravo and Bluestone are then sent in, and kill Yamato. Hirohito then announces Japan's surrender.

== Collected editions ==
Title	ISBN	Date	Contents
Über Volume 1	9781592912186	10 April 2014	Über #0-5
Über Volume 2	9781592912377	25 September 2014	Über #6-11
Über Volume 3	9781592912513	5 March 2014	Über #12-17
Über Volume 4	9781592912575	25 June 2014	Über #18-22, Special
Über Volume 5	9781592912681	22 October 2014	Über #23-27, The First Cycle
Über Volume 6	9781592913329	6 March 2018	Über Invasion #1-7

As of 2026, Invasion #8-17 remain uncollected.

== Reception ==
Über has received positive reviews. ComicsAlliance described it as one of Avatar's "most well-received and critically acclaimed" titles. Reviewing the first collection for Broken Frontier, Andy Oliver praised Gillen for shattering "the complacency of the moral structure" often present in war comics, calling it "compelling and unsettling". Andrew Girdwood of Geek Native also recommended the volume, "provided you can take a bit of comic book war gore".

Writing before the publication of Über: Invasion #12, Elias Rosner of Multiversity Comics took pains to warn readers that it "is not an easy series", but still recommended the series highly.
