= Ignition City =

2009 comic book limited series

Publication information
- Publisher: Avatar Press
- Schedule: Monthly
- Format: Limited series
- Genre: Alternate history, science fiction
- Publication date: April – October 2009
- No. of issues: 5

Creative team
- Created by: Warren Ellis; Gianluca Pagliarani
- Written by: Warren Ellis
- Penciller: Gianluca Pagliarani
- Inker: Chris Drier
- Colorist: Digikore Studios
- Editor: William A. Christensen

Collected editions
- Ignition City: ISBN 1-59291-087-4

Ignition City is a five-issue science fiction comic book limited series, written by Warren Ellis and illustrated by Gianluca Pagliarani. It was published in 2009 by American company Avatar Press.

== Publication history ==
Ellis initially conceived the plot in 2005. After some brief initial work in 2006, the series was not mentioned again until after the release of his Aetheric Mechanics in 2008. Inspirations included the Flash Gordon and Buck Rogers serials, the show Deadwood, the artist Magdalene Veen, the film Metropolis, the Berlin Tegel Airport, Ray Bradbury's short story "Rocket Summer", Alan Moore's comic The League of Extraordinary Gentlemen, and his own Ministry of Space comic (which was in turn inspired by Dan Dare).

== Plot ==
Ignition City is set in an atompunk/dieselpunk alternate history in the year 1956; in this timeline, World War II was interrupted by a Martian invasion. As a result, space travel became commonplace. Ignition City itself is Earth's last spaceport; a circular artificial island located in equatorial waters. Rockets launch from a ring of gantries ringing the island, and the interior is a shantytown populated by former spacemen who have found themselves out of work due to a planet-wide ban on space travel. The story follows Mary Raven, a young woman who travels to Ignition City after her father, a formerly famous spaceman named Rock Raven, is killed there.

== Characters ==
- Mary Raven – former astronaut and daughter of the space hero Rock Raven, comes to Ignition City to investigate the death of her father.
- Rock Raven – British space hero, veteran of campaigns against the Martians and thus possibly inspired by Dan Dare.
- Lionel "Buster" Crabb – British government official, a friend to Mary and her father. Based on the real life Navy officer thought captured and brainwashed by the Russians. (Not to be confused with Buster Crabbe, the actor who portrayed both Flash Gordon and Buck Rogers).
- Lightning Bowman – one of the first three humans in space (alongside Gayle Ransom and Doc Vukovic), now marooned in Ignition City. Inspired by Flash Gordon.
- Gayle Ransom – former lover of Lighting Bowman, and another of the first three humans in space, now a bar-owner and gun-runner in Ignition City. Inspired by Dale Arden.
- Dr. Dragomir Vukovic, AKA 'Doc Vukovic' – another of the first three humans in space, he built the original spaceship out of junk parts. Inspired by Dr. Hans Zarkov.
- Kharg the Killer – dictator of the planet Khargu and ally of Adolf Hitler, who was defeated by Lightning Bowman, Gayle Ransom, and Doc Vukovic. Inspired by Ming the Merciless.
- Bronco – drunken customer in Gayle Bowman's bar who talks of his time spent five centuries in the future, and thus analogous to Buck Rogers.
- Piet Vanderkirk – Gayle Bowman's right-hand man. Former member of the Royal Netherlands Navy's Solar Patrol in the Pluto Detachment, part of "The Chain" which appears to refer to a psychically linked group of soldiers using gifted alien technology, similar to E. E. Smith's Lensmen.
- Yuri – washed-up "Russia's greatest cosmonaut", since disavowed and abandoned in Ignition City.
- Marshal Pomeroy – Corrupt lawman of the Ignition City settlement. Flies with the aid of a jet pack, reminiscent of Commando Cody.

== Collected editions ==
The series has been collected into a trade paperback:

- Ignition City Volume 1 (144 pages, Avatar, February 2010, ISBN 1-59291-087-4)
