= Avatar Press =

American independent comic book publisher

- Founded: 1996; 30 years ago
- Founder: William A. Christensen
- Country of origin: United States
- Headquarters location: Rantoul, Illinois
- Distribution: Diamond Book Distributors (books)
- Key people: Warren Ellis, Garth Ennis, Alan Moore
- Publication types: Comic books
- Fiction genres: Bad girl, horror, superhero
- Imprints: Boundless Comics; Bleeding Cool
- Official website: avatarpress.com

Avatar Press is an independent American comic book publisher founded in 1996 by William A. Christensen, and based in Rantoul, Illinois. It was originally known for publishing bad girl comics, such as Pandora, Hellina, Lookers, The Ravening, and Brian Pulido's Lady Death. Later the company became better known for publishing particularly violent titles by popular and critically acclaimed writers such as Alan Moore, Garth Ennis, Warren Ellis, Jonathan Hickman, and Kieron Gillen.

Avatar also publishes the comics news site Bleeding Cool, helmed by Rich Johnston.

== History ==
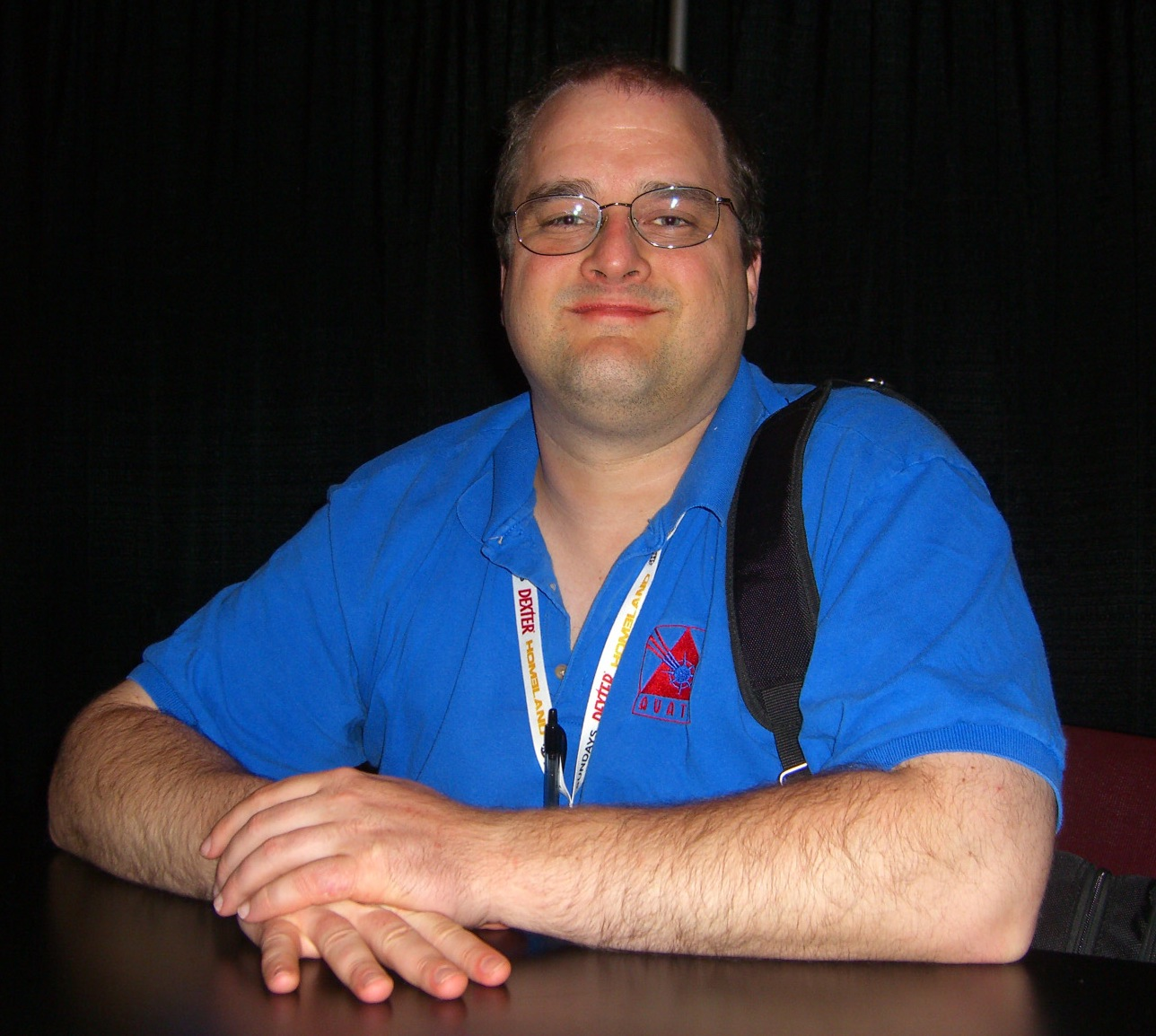
Founder and editor-in-chief William A. Christensen.

=== 1990s ===
Avatar Press launched in December 1996 with three titles: Pandora, Silent Rapture, and Donna Mia. Lookers followed in January, 1997. The founding publisher was Richard Christensen, his son William Christensen was editor-in-chief, and Mark Seifert was creative director.

The Christensens previously founded the comic book retail outfit Comic Cavalcade in 1989, when William Christensen was 16 years old. Seifert worked as a manager at Comic Cavalcade. Seifert and William Christensen co-bylined several articles for Wizard magazine during the early 1990s, including installments of "The Wizard’s Crystal Ball" column, an interview with Alan Moore, and a Jack Kirby retrospective. Before the launch of Avatar Press, William Christensen was also credited as "managing editor," among other roles, at London Night Studios in 1995 and 1996.

Avatar began publishing at the end of the 1990s comic book speculation boom and bust, when many publishers and retailers were going out of business, yet the company expanded, publishing titles by creators such as Mike Wolfer, David Quinn, Tim Vigil, Eric Powell, and Warren Ellis. Pandora became the company's flagship character, appearing in crossovers with numerous other "bad girl" characters, including Hellina, Razor, Lady Death, Shotgun Mary, and Widow.

=== 2000s ===
In 2000, Avatar Press began publishing comics featuring characters licensed from Rob Liefeld's defunct Awesome Comics company, including Avengelyne and The Coven. The next year, Avatar began publishing previously unreleased issues of Glory written by Moore and originally intended for Awesome. More works by Moore followed, including adaptations of his prose stories and song lyrics, such as Alan Moore's Magic Words, and reprints such as the graphic novel A Small Killing.

Avatar soon attracted other critically acclaimed writers such as Garth Ennis, Jamie Delano, and Mark Millar. Ennis became a particularly active writer for the company. He brought his series Dicks with John McCrea over from Caliber Comics in 2002, then wrote a series of new titles, including 303 in 2004, Chronicles of Wormwood in 2006, Crossed in 2008, and Stitched in 2012. He brought his series War Stories, previously published under DC's Vertigo imprint, to Avatar in 2014.

Ellis continued to publish material through Avatar as well. In 2004, the company published four comics written by Ellis under the label "Apparat Singles Group." Described as "a group of imaginary first issues of imaginary series from an imaginary line of comics," the books represented Ellis's vision of what comics could have been like if the industry had drawn more inspiration from pulp magazines instead of superhero comics. Ellis's 2007 title Black Summer, about a superhero assassinating the President of the United States, garnered a cover story from American Prospect magazine.

Asked in 2009 how Avatar attracted well-known writers like Ellis and Moore, Christiansen cited creative freedom. Millar says Avatar was the only company willing to publish his series The Unfunnies because it was so "extreme." Eventually the company became better known for publishing titles by critically acclaimed, popular writers featuring extreme content, such as Crossed, than for the company's earlier bad girl titles.

Avatar also licensed comic book adaptations of famous science-fiction and horror movies and television shows, such as RoboCop, Stargate, Night of the Living Dead, A Nightmare on Elm Street, Friday the 13th and The Texas Chainsaw Massacre.

The company launched the comic book and pop culture news site Bleeding Cool in 2009 with Rich Johnston as head writer and Mark Seiffert as managing editor.

=== 2010s to present ===
Moore expanded his output for Avatar over the course of the 2010s. In need of quick money to pay a tax bill, Moore created a new comic book mini-series for Avatar called Neonomicon. The series was published in 2010 and featured art by Jacen Burrows. Much of what Moore says will be his final comics work before retiring from the medium was published by Avatar Press, including Crossed +100, Providence, and Cinema Purgatorio.

Avatar continued to expand its line-up of titles from high profile writers in the early 2010s, adding books like Kieron Gillen's Uber and Jonathan Hickman's God Is Dead, both in 2013. In 2016, Comics Alliance described Uber as "the backbone of Avatar Press' overall line" and "one of the publisher's most well-received and critically acclaimed comics."

In 2013, Delano said he wouldn't do any " and further work for Avatar after the company sold a "torture" variant cover depicting sexual violence towards women for an issue of Crossed he wrote. Later that year comics journalist Heidi MacDonald criticized Avatar's "torture" covers in general, asking "what kind of person buys a “Torture variant” cover anyway?" MacDonald's article prompted numerous responses, including one from then new Crossed writer Justin Jordan, but MacDonald noted how civil the debate remained.

Avatar launched a new imprint called Boundless Comics in 2010 to publish a new line of Lady Death titles and similar bad girl and "cheesecake" comics titles similar to those Avatar published during its early days. The imprint launched War Goddess featuring early Avatar characters Pandora, Hellina, and Widow in 2011 and a new Lookers title in 2016.

Avatar's Bleeding Cool website was criticized in 2018 after publishing an interview with far-right writer Vox Day conducted by Seifert. Bleeding Cool apologized for running the interview and appointed Kaitlyn Booth as editor-in-chief. Seifert remains managing editor of the site, according to his author page on the site.

As of June 2023, the Avatar Press website's news page has not been updated since October, 2020. In 2021, the company released the Providence Compendium and the Warrior Nun Dora graphic novel, both of which had been crowdfunded on Kickstarter in 2020. Avatar also released a new Jungle Fantasy Fauna series under the Boundless imprint in 2021. No new issues of Jungle Fantasy Fauna were published in 2022, but the fifth issue is solicited for December 2023. Meanwhile both Avatar and Boundless continue to solicit reprints and bundles of previously published material and Bleeding Cool continues to operate.

== Titles ==
=== By author ===
- Jamie Delano:
  - Narcopolis
  - Rawbone
- Mike Deodato:
  - Jade Warriors
- Warren Ellis:
  - Aetheric Mechanics
  - Anna Mercury
  - Apparat
  - Atmospherics
  - Bad Signal
  - Bad World
  - Blackgas
  - Black Summer
  - Captain Swing and the Electrical Pirates of Cindery Island
  - Crécy
  - Dark Blue
  - Doktor Sleepless
  - Frankenstein's Womb
  - FreakAngels
  - Gravel
  - Ilium
  - Ignition City
  - No Hero
  - Scars
  - Supergod
  - Wolfskin
- Garth Ennis:
  - 303
  - Chronicles of Wormwood
  - Crossed
  - Dicks
  - Rover Red Charlie
  - Stitched
  - Streets of Glory
- Christos Gage:
  - Absolution
- Kieron Gillen:
  - Mercury Heat
  - Über
- Steven Grant:
  - Mortal Souls
  - My Flesh is Cool
- Jonathan Hickman:
  - God Is Dead
- David Lapham:
  - Caligula
  - Dan the Unharmable
  - Ferals
- Rob Liefeld:
  - Avengelyne
  - The Coven
  - Glory
- Mark Millar:
  - The Unfunnies
- Alan Moore:
  - Another Suburban Romance
  - Cinema Purgatorio
  - The Courtyard
  - The Courtyard Companion
  - Fashion Beast
  - Glory
  - Hypothetical Lizard
  - Light of Thy Countenance
  - Magic Words
  - Neonomicon
  - Nightjar
  - Providence
  - A Small Killing
  - Writing for Comics
  - Yuggoth Cultures and Other Growths
- Zak Penn:
  - Hero Worship
- Eric Powell:
  - The Goon
- Brian Pulido:
  - Belladonna
  - Gypsy
  - Lady Death (of Chaos Comics fame)
  - Unholy
  - War Angel
- John A. Russo:
  - Escape of the Living Dead
- William Tucci:
  - Shi
- Tim Vigil:
  - 777: The Wrath
  - Cuda: An Age of Metal and Magic
  - Faust/777: The Wrath (aka Darkness in Collision)
  - Faust: Book of M
  - Webwitch
- Mike Wolfer:
  - Widow

=== Selected other titles ===
- Pandora (Avatar's flagship character)
- Demonslayer by Marat Mychael
- Dreamwalker by Jenni Gregory
- Hellina
- Jungle Fantasy, starring Fauna from the Threshold series' "Fauna, Jungle Girl"
- Jungle Fantasy: Ivory, starring an independent cave-woman named Ivory who is a "widow" in search of her infant son who was abducted
- Lookers
- Medieval Lady Death
- Nira-X Cyberangel by Bill Maus
- The Ravening
- Razor by Everette Hartsoe
- Rich Johnston's Holed Up by Rich Johnston
- Twilight, which, along with Twilight: Live Wire, was reprinted in Twilight: Raw

=== Adaptations and licensed properties ===
==== By author ====
- Max Brooks:
  - The Extinction Parade
- Joe R. Lansdale:
  - By Bizarre Hands
  - The Drive-in
  - On the Far Side With Dead Folks
- George R. R. Martin:
  - Fevre Dream
  - The Skin Trade

==== Selected other titles ====
- Frank Miller's RoboCop
- Friday the 13th
- George A. Romero's Night of the Living Dead
- A Nightmare on Elm Street
- Species
- Stargate
- The Texas Chainsaw Massacre
