= God Is Dead (comics) =

Comic book

Publication information
- Publisher: Avatar Press
- Schedule: Monthly
- Genre: Mythology
- Publication date: September 2013

Creative team
- Written by: Jonathan Hickman Issues 1–6, Mike Costa 1–, Alan Moore & Simon Spurrier Acts of God
- Artist: Di Amorim Issues 1–6, German Erramouspe Issues 10–12, Omar Francia Issues 13–15, German Nobile Issue 25, Michael DiPascale Issue 25, Nahuel Lopez Issue 34, 37 Juan Figeri Issues 7–9, 19-20, 23-24, 28-30, 33, 36, 40-41, 44-45, Emiliano Urdinola Issues 16–18, 21-22, 26-27, 31-32, 35, 38-39, 42-43, 46-48

God Is Dead was a comic book series created by Jonathan Hickman and Mike Costa, published by American company Avatar Press. It dealt with ancient gods and goddesses from mythologies around the world coming to Earth to lay claim to the world of man. The subplot deals with a group of people named the Collective, who resist the ancient gods.

== Publication history ==
God is Dead began as a six-issue limited series in September 2013, with Hickman and Costa as co-writers. Once the initial six-issue story arc concluded, the comic became an ongoing series with Costa as the only writer. In August 2014, Alan Moore and Simon Spurrier contributed to the first issue of a new story arc entitled God Is Dead: The Book of Acts. The series concluded in 2016 with its 48th issue.

== Cover art ==
The cover art of the comics typically featured five different covers. The initial one would be a solid color with a religious symbol. The other styles of covers were "Enchanted", "Iconic", "Carnage", and "End of Days".

== Plot ==
In 2015, a man claiming to be Zeus, the ancient Greek god of thunder, arrives in Vatican City and claims the Earth as his domain. This event becomes known as the Second Coming. In subsequent months, several other figures claiming to be gods and goddesses emerge as if from nowhere, and begin to divide the Earth into different territories. Fighting between the various gods breaks out, and drags the Earth into war.

Unknown to the gods, an underground society known as the Collective suspects that the gods are not who they appear to be, and seek to create their own new gods to rival those of the ancient pantheons. The Collective is eventually destroyed by the gods, but one member, Gaby, survives, and a generation later has risen to take the identity of the Earth Mother, Gaia.

As Gaia, Gaby rules over the world virtually unchallenged by the gods that still remain. One of her followers, Tansy, travels to Australia, which has been abandoned since the events of the Second Coming. Once there, she meets a man named Albert Spencer, who survived the Second Coming and has been residing in the Dreamtime with a ragtag group of humans. Together, they use a device to go to Heaven and find the Judeo-Christian-Islamic God with his head blown off. Albert then decides to unite the remnants of Earth's pantheons to lead an assault on Gaia.

As Albert attempts to form alliances, at Gaia's palace, her servants begin to question her motives and her divinity after she kills multiple members of the community that worship her. Hephaestus forms his own alliance among Gaia and Baldr, and organizes a counterattack against the lesser gods, which is successful, until the lesser gods attack. Hephaestus then descends into the bowels of a nearby mountain, and releases the Titans to do battle. Meanwhile, Lily, Gaia's high priestess who discovers the Collective's hideout, flies with a massive dragon, carrying a nuclear weapon. A final battle is waged between the Titans and the remnants of the gods, ending with Lily dropping a nuclear weapon and killing Gaia. In doing so, the Earth begins to dry and shrivel, until Jesus, dressed as a normal human man, emerges in a flash of light.

Soon after, Albert shoots Jesus in the head, saying he has had enough of Saviors and gods. However, he soon discovers the world dissolving, including the Dreamtime. Jesus shows up in Australia and resurrects not only the Earth, but the population as well. Albert rushes home and finds his family alive and well. As they explore the city, they are attacked by a group of thugs, and his family is attacked and seemingly killed. But he discovers they are alive, although maimed. He goes and confronts Jesus, Dionysus, and Tansy as they celebrate. Jesus and Tansy escape, but Dionysus is torn apart. Across the world in Greece, Hephaestus, who has escaped from the Underworld with Apollo, arrives in Olympus, and to his shock finds Zeus alive and well, having been resurrected by Jesus's powers.

Accused of treachery by the other Olympian gods, Hephaestus is imprisoned, and soon after it is revealed that Jesus's resurrection magic worked not only on the Olympian pantheon, but all the other Pantheons as well as the Norse Gods arrive led by Odin to lead an assault on Olympus. The attack results in every Olympian being massacred, with Zeus being sent to the Underworld underneath his brother Hades. In the Underworld, it is revealed that there is a tentative alliance between Hades and Satan, who is having relations with Hades' wife, Persephone. A city is founded called Apollonia, named after the sun god Apollo, which only allows the most perfect physical specimens of mankind into its walls. In Australia, in order to stop the suffering of all the people in the world who cannot die from their horrific wounds, Tansy releases the dragon Baphomet who bites Jesus in half and kills him, enabling people on Earth to die again.

As people now find that they are able to die again, an assault is led on the Titans to stop them from destroying the Earth. In a final desperate attempt, Atlas calls upon Gaia, Mother Earth, herself to avenge him and his brethren. She resurrects and begins to destroy the Earth and the heavens, even going so far as to devour the moon. The only who can stop her is Gaby, who is still human in this resurrected timeline. In order to stop Gaia, she chooses to take the concoction that made her Gaia, and emerges as a stone encrusted female figure. She attacks Gaia, but the resulting attack succeeds in destroying the Earth and opening a black hole. Satan reveals this was the plan all along, even though it will result in his destruction. He is consumed by Baphomet and the Earth vanishes, along with the deities, into a black hole.

In a limbo, all the deities have been resurrected and are constantly fighting under the eyes of the death deities of various Pantheons. The Hindu Pantheon receive a visitor in the form of a nude woman who calls herself Siddharta and the Buddha, and that she is here to spread learning and knowledge to the Pantheons. It is revealed that she has actually come from another universe where there is no belief in gods, where she sought enlightenment and ended up travelling between dimensions to the limbo where the deities are. As she travels to visit the various gods to collect artifacts, the death gods become curious as to where the portal she came through leads. One of them, the African deity Ogbunabali, decides to investigate and falls into a void to land in Siddharta's mortal body on the other side. Crazed with the ability to feel life, he goes on a murderous rampage.

Elsewhere, the mention in the world of the name Zeus summons the Greek deity from limbo to this world. Once there, he goes about establishing himself by bringing Hermes with him and having sex with multiple women to bring his bastards into the world. Sensing new territory, the Egyptian pantheon follows suit, and soon are engaged into another battle with the Greek deities. The Aztecs are soon called upon to fight for this world, but all the Pantheons are shocked when God is resurrected.

Flashing forward, churches are being constructed. Siddharta seeks asylum in the realm of the Japanese Kami, as the other Pantheons are attacked by the angels of God. She makes an alliance with the Kami and travels to the trickster Gods, asking them for help in retrieving her body. With the help of them and the Kami, she is able to take control of her body and banish Ogbunabali from it. As Siddharta recovers, Satan leads the remainder of the Norse gods to Heaven and begins an assault on it, while Loki on a mission to start Ragnarok obtains two god killers, who are able to end the lives of gods permanently. He is betrayed by Ogbunabali, who kills Loki and takes control of the god killers. Satan kills God and takes control of heaven as Siddharta takes control of the global news network.

In the final conflict, Ogbunabali is killed by Amaterasu, and this leads the two god killers to go on a rampage, killing all the members of every Pantheon on Earth. With all the deities destroyed, Siddharta kills herself, appearing in spirit form before the god killing brothers, and summons them to an eternal paradise as the world has no more need of deities. Years later, society has rebuilt, but in a final shot, the skull Siddharta drew can be seen on a wall in an alleyway.

== Pantheons ==
The comic features the members of many of the Pantheons of the Ancient world. The following have made appearances in the series:

The Aboriginal Pantheon

- Altjira
- Green Ants

American Folklore

- Sasquatch

The Ashanti Pantheon

- Anansi

The Aztec Pantheon

- Huitzilopochtli
- Mictlantecuhtli
- Mictecacihuatl
- Quetzalcoatl
- Tezcatlipoca

The Babylonian Pantheon

- Dagon

Brazilian Folklore

- Saci

Buddhism

- Chakrasamavara

The Canaanite Pantheon

- Astoreth
- Moloch

The Celtic Pantheon

- Arianrhod
- Artio (issue #8 cover only)
- Branwen
- Cù-sìth
- Nuckelavee
- Rhiannon

The Egyptian Pantheon

- Anubis
- Bastet
- Horus
- Isis
- Ra
- The Ogdoad

The Greek Pantheon

- Aphrodite
- Apollo
- Ares
- Artemis
- Athena
- Cerberus
- Chimera
- Clio
- Demeter
- Dionysus
- Enyalius
- Euterpe
- Eris
- Eros
- Hades
- Hecate
- Helios
- Hephaestus
- Hermes
- Janus
- Moros
- Nike
- Oizys
- Pan
- Persephone
- Phantasos
- Phoenix
- Phobetor
- Poseidon
- Thanatos
- Zeus

The Hindu Pantheon

- Brahma
- Ganesha
- Kartikeya
- Mara
- Parvati
- Sheshanaga
- Shiva
- Trimurti – While not an actual deity, Vishnu, Brahma, and Shiva could merge to form a giant being referred to as the Trimurti.
- Vishnu

The Igbo Pantheon

- Ogbunabali

The Japanese Pantheon

- Amaterasu
- Izanagi
- Izanami
- Kagutsuchi
- Susanoo

The Judeo-Christian Pantheon

- Adam
- Azazel
- Baphomet
- Beelzebub
- Eve
- God
- Jesus
- Jibreel
- Mammon
- Michael
- Satan
- Seraphim
- Serpent
- Uriel

The Norse Pantheon

- Baldr
- Bergelmir
- Fenrir
- Heiðr
- Heimdallr
- Hel
- Jormungandr
- Loki
- Móðguðr
- Odin
- Ratatoskr
- Surtr
- Thor
- Váli

The Polynesian Pantheon

- Adaro
- Māui
- Moai

Slavic Folklore

- Baba Yaga

The Sumerian Pantheon

- Thammuz

The Titans

- Arke
- Atlas
- Cronus
- Gaia
- Iapetus
- Perses
- Phoebe
- Oceanus
- Rhea

The Arabic Pantheon

- Iblis
- Ifrit

Native American Pantheon

- Bakbakwalanooksiwae – A cannibalistic deity from the far North of America.
- Coyote
- Deer Women
- Ishkintini
- Jogah
- Nayenezgani and Tobadzistsini – Two brothers who have the ability to kill gods.
- Okwa Naholo
- Wendigo
- Ya-o-gah

== Reception ==
The series has received mostly negative reviews. Hugh Armitage of Digital Spy said that the series is an old concept, and that the characters are too one-dimensional. Armitage went on to say that the portrayal of the Hindu gods would be offensive to modern Hindus. Cheryl CS of The Pulp praised the art and fight scenes, but called the main story "cheesy" and "confusing."
