= Alan Moore's Yuggoth Cultures and Other Growths =

2003 comic miniseries

- Cover to Alan Moore's Yuggoth Cultures #2. Art by Juan Jose Ryp

Publication information
- Publisher: Avatar Press
- Schedule: Monthly
- Format: Miniseries
- Genre: Dark fantasy Horror comics
- Publication date: September–November 2003
- No. of issues: 3

Creative team
- Created by: Alan Moore
- Written by: Alan Moore; Antony Johnston
- Artist(s): Juan Jose Ryp; Bryan Talbot; Mike Wolfer; Val Semeiks; Jacen Burrows; Hunt Emerson; Oscar Zarate; Marat Mychaels

Collected editions
- Yuggoth Cultures: ISBN 1-59291-027-0

Alan Moore's Yuggoth Cultures and Other Growths is a three-issue comic book miniseries presenting work written by comics writer Alan Moore, based on the writings of horror writer H. P. Lovecraft. It was published by Avatar Press in 2003.

== Background ==
After Dave Mitchell of Oneiros Books asked Alan Moore to contribute to The Starry Wisdom, a collection of new writings inspired by H. P. Lovecraft, Moore came up with the idea to do an entire book, to be called Yuggoth Cultures, based on Lovecraft's Fungi From Yuggoth cycle of poems. Unfortunately, Moore lost the only copies of most of the pieces he had written for the book in a London taxi cab. Moore submitted a short story entitled "The Courtyard" as his entry for The Starry Wisdom, but suspended work on Yuggoth Cultures. "So the project went 'on hold,' ... I kind of shoved it in the back of a drawer and forgot about it," he told Avatar editor-in-chief William Christensen in an interview included in Yuggoth Cultures and Other Growths No. 3. The two other surviving pieces from Yuggoth Cultures, the poems "Recognition" and "Zaman's Hill," were included in the 1995 book Dust: A Creation Books Reader.

Avatar's 2003 anthology miniseries Yuggoth Cultures and Other Growths presented Antony Johnston's comics adaptation of "Recognition" and "Zaman's Hill" as well as two of Alan Moore's songs, "Litvinoff's Book" and "Me and Dorothy Parker", the never-before-seen "Nightjar", and reprints of many of Alan Moore's short comics.

== Publication ==
The series was published as a three-part black-and-white monthly comic:

=== Issue #1 (September 2003) ===
- "Zaman's Hill" (adapted by Antony Johnston from Moore's poem, art by Juan Jose Ryp)
- "Nightjar" (art by Bryan Talbot, planned as the first instalment of a serial to appear in Warrior)
- Nightjar first draft script by Alan Moore
- A letter from Alan Moore to Bryan Talbot outlining the creation of Nightjar
- Nightjar commentary by Bryan Talbot

=== Issue No. 2 (October 2003) ===
- "Litvinoff's Book" (adapted by Antony Johnston from Moore's song, art by Mike Wolfer)
- "Cold Snap" (art by Bryan Talbot, previously published in the 1985 Flying Pig benefit comic Food for Thought)
- "Itchy Peterson: Just Born Lucky I Guess" (pencils by Val Semeiks, inks by Kevin Conrad, previously published in Chaos! Comics' Nightmare Theater #4 in 1997)
- "The Nativity on Ice" (written by Alan Moore under the pen name "Kurt Vile", with art by Bryan Talbot, previously published in Kimota Magazine #3 in 1995)
- "Recognition" (adapted by Antony Johnston from Moore's poem, art by Jacen Burrows)

=== Issue No. 3. Published November 2003 ===
- "Leviticus" (art by Hunt Emerson, previously published in Knockabout Comics' Outrageous Tales From the Old Testament in 1987)
- "I Keep Coming Back" (art by Oscar Zarate, described as a coda to From Hell, previously published by Serpent's Tail in It's Dark in London in 1996)
- "Me and Dorothy Parker" (adapted by Antony Johnston from Moore's song, art by Marat Mychaels)
- "The Story Behind the Stories" – An interview with Alan Moore about the Yuggoth Cultures and Other Growths by William Christensen, edited by Antony Johnston

Alan Moore's The Courtyard was originally scheduled for appearances in this collection but was turned into its own separate series.

== Collected editions ==
The three-issue miniseries and more were collected into a trade paperback, Yuggoth Cultures and Other Growths (Avatar, 334 pages, 2006 softcover, ISBN 1-59291-026-2, hardcover, ISBN 1-59291-027-0), containing

- Yuggoth Cultures and Other Growths #1–3 (See above for contents)
- "Magic Is Afoot" (Alan Moore interviewed by Jay Babcock, originally published in Arthur No. 4, May 2003)
- "Rolling Commentary" (A political essay by Alan Moore, originally published in Arthur No. 5, July 2003)
- Alan Moore Interview (Conducted by Alan David Doane, February 2004)
- Yuggoth Creatures #1–3 (An unrelated Lovecraft-inspired miniseries written by Antony Johnston)
- "Shadows Over Lovecraft" (An essay on H. P. Lovecraft by NG Christakos)
- Yuggoth Creatures Annotated, Volumes 1–3 (Antony Johnston's scripts with annotations by NG Christakos)

== Spin-offs ==
=== Nightjar ===
The Nightjar story was spun off into a four-part miniseries written by Johnston with art by Max Fiumara, plus a one-shot entitled Nightjar: Hollow Bones. The basis was the story as seen in Yuggoth Cultures #1 with some additional notes from Bryan Talbot, but the bulk of the story was created by Johnston.

=== Yuggoth Creatures ===
Johnston would later produce more work in the Cthulhu Mythos, for Avatar, under the title Yuggoth Creatures. All three issues are included in the collected Alan Moore's Yuggoth Cultures and Other Growths.

== Sources ==
- Alan Moore's Yuggoth Cultures and Other Growths at the Grand Comics Database
- Alan Moore's Yuggoth Cultures and Other Growths at the Comic Book DB (archived from the original)
- Nightjar at the Comic Book DB (archived from the original)
- Yuggoth Creatures at the Comic Book DB (archived from the original)
