= Mike Costa =

American comic book writer

- Occupations: Comic book writer, Television writer, Producer
- Years active: 2008 - present
- Notable work: GI Joe: Cobra, Transformers, Resistance

Mike Costa is an American comic book and television writer. His first published work was 2008's The Secret History of the Authority: Hawksmoor with artist Fiona Staples for WildStorm. He also wrote Resistance, a comic book series based on the Resistance video games. Costa has written Transformers for IDW. Costa is currently writing IDW Publishing’s G.I. Joe: Cobra and Blackhawks for DC Comics.

His work on the GI Joe franchise was critically acclaimed and lauded by Brian K. Vaughan as an example of a licensed comic equal in quality to mainstream or creator-owned works.

He began writing for the FOX TV show Lucifer in its first season, and became a producer after it moved to Netflix during the fourth season.

== Bibliography ==
=== Wildstorm ===
- Secret History of The Authority: Hawksmoor (limited series, March 2008-August 2008)
  - Secret History of the Authority: Hawksmoor (tpb, 144 pages, 2009, ISBN 1-4012-2207-2) collects:
    - "Uptown & Downtown" (with Fiona Staples, in #1, 2008)
    - "Housing & Development" (with Fiona Staples, in #2, 2008)
    - "Bridge & Tunnel" (with Fiona Staples, in #3, 2008)
    - "Parks & Recreation" (with Fiona Staples, in #4, 2008)
    - "Highways & Byways" (with Fiona Staples, in #5, 2008)
    - "Town & Country" (with Fiona Staples, in #6, 2008)
- Resistance (limited series, January 2009-May 2009)
  - Resistance (tpb, 160 pages, 2010, ISBN 1-4012-2672-8) collects:
    - "Dancers On A Plane" (with Ramón K. Pérez, in #1, 2009)
    - "False Start" (with Ramón K. Pérez, in #2, 2009)
    - "Fool's House" (with Ramón K. Pérez, in #3, 2009)
    - "Untitled" (with Ramón K. Pérez, in #4, 2009)
    - "Target With Five Faces" (with Ramón K. Pérez, in #5, 2009)
    - "White Flag" (with Ramón K. Pérez, in #6, 2009)

=== IDW Publishing ===
- G.I. Joe: Cobra vol. 1 (limited series, March 2009-June 2009)
  - volume 1 (tpb, 132 pages, 2009, ISBN 1-60010-535-1) collects:
    - "Charmer" (with Christos Gage and Antonio Fuso, in #1, 2009)
    - "In The Grass" (with Christos Gage and Antonio Fuso, in #2, 2009)
    - "Oil" (with Christos Gage and Antonio Fuso, in #3, 2009)
    - "Eyes" (with Christos Gage and Antonio Fuso, in #4, 2009)
    - "Cobra" (with Antonio Fuso, in G.I. Joe: Cobra Special #1, 2009)
- The Transformers: All Hail Megatron #13, "Uneasy Lies the Head", #16, "The Man of Steel (with Chee Yang Ong and Guido Guidi, July–October 2009) collected in Volume 4 (tpb, 104 pages, 2010, ISBN 1-60010-592-0)
- The Transformers #1-31 (November 2009-December 2011)
  - Volume 1: For All Mankind (tpb, 152 pages, 2010, ISBN 1-60010-684-6) collects:
    - "...For All Mankind" (with Don Figueroa, in #1, 2009)
    - "Things Fall Apart" (with Don Figueroa, in #2-5, 2009–2010)
  - Volume 2: International Incident (tpb, 144 pages, 2010, ISBN 1-60010-804-0) collects:
    - "All His Engines" (with E. J. Su, in #7, 2010)
    - "Scrapper" (with Javier Saltares, in #8, 2010)
    - "International Incident" (with Guido Guidi, in #9-12, 2010)
  - Volume 3: Revenge of the Decepticons (tpb, 148 pages, 2011, ISBN 1-60010-981-0) collects:
    - "Heart Like A Wheel" (with Nick Roche, in #13, 2010)
    - "Revenge of the Decepticons" (with Don Figueroa and Alex Milne, in #14-18, 2010–2011)
  - Volume 5: Chaos Theory (tpb, 124 pages, 2011, ISBN 1-61377-090-1) collects:
    - "Space Opera" (with Guido Guidi, in #19-21, 2011)
    - "Chaos Theory" (with Alex Milne, in #22-23, 2011)
  - Volume 6: Police Action (tpb, 104 pages, 2012, ISBN 1-61377-164-9) collects:
    - "Police Action" (with Brendan Cahill, in #25, #27, #29, 2011)
    - "Ride-Along" (with E. J. Su, in The Transformers: Spotlight - Prowl, 2010)
  - Volume 7: Chaos (tpb, 124 pages, 2012, ISBN 1-61377-140-1) collects:
    - "Chaos" (with James Roberts and Livio Ramondelli, in #24, #26, #28, #30, 2011)
    - "Pax Cybertronia" (with Casey W. Coller, in #31, 2011)
- G.I. Joe: Cobra vol. 2 #1-13 (January 2010-February 2011)
  - Volume 2 (tpb, 122 pages, 2010, ISBN 1-60010-757-5) collects:
    - "Forked Tongue" (with Christos Gage and Antonio Fuso, in #1, 2010)
    - "Scales" (with Christos Gage and Antonio Fuso, in #2, 2010)
    - "Fangs" (with Christos Gage and Antonio Fuso, in #3, 2010)
    - "Cold-Blooded" (with Christos Gage and Antonio Fuso, in #4, 2010)
    - "Chameleon: Changing Colors; Speed Trap" (with Antonio Fuso, in G.I. Joe: Cobra Special #2, 2010)
  - Volume 3 (tpb, 120 pages, 2011, ISBN 1-60010-880-6) collects:
    - "Serpent's Tale, Part 1: The Nest" (with Christos Gage and Sergio Carrera, in #5, 2010)
    - "Serpent's Tale Part 2: The Nest" (with Christos Gage and Sergio Carrera, in #6, 2010)
    - "Serpent's Tale part 3: Green Dreams" (written by Christos Gage and drawn by Sergio Carrera, in #7, 2010)
    - "Serpent's Tale Part 4: Viper's Nest" (with Christos Gage and Sergio Carrera, in #8, 2010)
    - "Serpent's Tale, Part 5: Viper's Nest" (with Christos Gage and Sergio Carrera, in #9, 2010)
  - Volume 4 (tpb, 104 pages, 2011, ISBN 1-60010-988-8) collects:
    - "Sidewinder" (with Christos Gage, Antonio Fuso and S.L. Gallant, in #10, 2010)
    - "Constrictor" (with Christos Gage, Antonio Fuso and Chee Yang Ong, in #11, 2010)
    - "Rattler" (with Christos Gage and Antonio Fuso, in #12, 2011)
    - "King Cobra" (with Christos Gage and Antonio Fuso, in #13, 2011)
- The Transformers: Ironhide (limited series, May 2010-August 2010)
  - The Transformers: Ironhide (tpb, 104 pages, 2010, ISBN 1-60010-806-7) collects:
    - "The Iron Age" (with Casey W. Coller, in #1, 2010)
    - "Iron In The Blood" (with Casey W. Coller, in #2, 2010)
    - "Ironing Out the Details" (with Casey W. Coller, in #3, 2010)
    - "Any Old Iron" (with Casey W. Coller, in #4, 2010)
- G.I. Joe: Cobra vol. 3 #0-21 (May 2011-January 2013)
  - G.I. Joe: Cobra Civil War Compendium (tpb, 564 pages, 2013, 1-61377-561-X) collects:
    - "G.I. Joe: Cobra Civil War" #0 (with Chuck Dixon and Agustin Padilla, 2011)
    - "Cobra Civil War Part 3" (with Antonio Fuso, in #1, 2011)
    - "Cobra Civil War Part 6" (with Antonio Fuso, in #2, 2011)
    - "Cobra Civil War Part 9" (with Antonio Fuso, in #3, 2011)
    - "Cobra Civil War Part 12" (with Antonio Fuso, in #4, 2011)
    - "Cobra Civil War Part 15" (with Werther Dell'Edera, in #5, 2011)
    - "Cobra Civil War Part 18" (with Werther Dell'Edera, in #6, 2011)
    - "Cobra Civil War Part 21" (with Antonio Fuso, in #7, 2011)
    - "Cobra Civil War Part 24" (with Antonio Fuso and Werther Dell'Edera, in #8, 2011)
  - G.I. Joe: Complete Cobra Command (tpb, 328 pages, 2013, ISBN 1-61377-636-5) collects:
    - "Cobra Command Part 3" (with Alex Cal, in #9, 2012)
    - "Cobra Command Part 6" (with Alex Cal, in #10, 2012)
    - "Cobra Command Part 9" (with Alex Cal, in #11, 2012)
    - "The Last Laugh: Cobra Command Aftermath" (with Antonio Fuso, in #12, 2012)
  - G.I. Joe: Cobra - Son of the Snake (tpb, 104 pages, 2013, ISBN 1-61377-547-4) collects:
    - "Son of the Snake, Part 1: A New Era" (with Antonio Fuso, in #13, 2012)
    - "Son of the Snake, Part 2: G.I. Joe Underground" (with Antonio Fuso and Werther Dell'Edera, in #14, 2012)
    - "Son of the Snake, Part 3: Lies and Betrayals" (with Antonio Fuso and Werther Dell'Edera, in #15, 2012)
    - "Son of the Snake, Part 4; The Hunt is On!" (with Antonio Fuso, in #16, 2012)
  - G.I. Joe: Cobra - Oktober Guard (tpb, 128 pages, 2013, ISBN 1-61377-618-7) collects:
    - "Oktober Guard, Part 1: Blood Lines" (with Werther Dell'Edera, in #17, 2012)
    - "Oktober Guard, Part 2: Oktober is Coming!" (with Antonio Fuso, in #18, 2012)
    - "Oktober Guard, Part 3: The Ocktober Guard" (with Antonio Fuso and Atilio Rojo, in #19, 2012)
    - "Oktober Guard, Part 4: Oktober is Burning!" (with Antonio Fuso and Werther Dell'Edera, in #20, 2012)
    - "Oktober Guard, Part 5: Oktober Ends!" (with Werther Dell'Edera, in #21, 2013)
- Smoke and Mirrors (5-issue limited series, with Jon Armstrong and Ryan Browne, March–August 2012, collected in Smoke and Mirrors, tpb, 128 pages, 2012, ISBN 1-61377-402-8)
- Haunted Horror #2-3, #5-8 (with Antonio Fuso, December 2012-December 2013)
- G.I. Joe: The Cobra Files #1-9 (April 2013-December 2013)
  - Volume 1 (tpb, 104 pages, 2013, ISBN 1-61377-731-0) collects:
    - "Snakes and Tigers" (with Antonio Fuso, in #1-4, 2013)
  - Volume 2 (tpb, 124 pages, 2014, ISBN 1-61377-918-6) collects:
    - "The Boy Most Likely To....." (with Werther Dell'Edera, in #5-6, 2013)
    - "The House Always Wins" (with Antonio Fuso, in #7-9, 2013)
- G.I. JOE: Snake Eyes, Agent of Cobra (limited series, January 2015-May 2015)
  - G.I. JOE: Snake Eyes, Agent of Cobra (tpb, 120 pages, 2015, ISBN 1-63140-371-0) collects:
    - "Part One: The Tin Man" (with Paolo Villainelli, in #1, 2015)
    - "Part Two: The Dark Sister" (with Paolo Villainelli, in #2, 2015)
    - "Part Three: The Lost Boy" (with Paolo Villainelli, in #3, 2015)
    - "Part Four: Knight Errant" (with Paolo Villainelli, in #4, 2015)
    - "Part Five: The Silent Warrior" (with Paolo Villainelli, in #5, 2015)

=== DC Comics ===
- Blackhawks #1-6 (September 2011-April 2012)
  - Volume 1: The Great Leap Forward (tpb, 192 pages, 2012, ISBN 1-4012-3714-2) collects:
    - "Blackhawks" (with Graham Nolan, in #1, 2011)
    - "Blades" (with Graham Nolan, in #2, 2011)
    - "Beauty" (with Graham Nolan, in #3, 2011)
    - "Bones" (with Graham Nolan, in #4, 2011)
    - "Burial" (with CAFU, in #5, 2012)
    - "Obsolescence Part 1: Technical" (with CAFU, in #6, 2012)
    - "Obsolescence Part 2: Functional" (with CAFU and Carlos Rodriguez, in #7, 2012)
    - "Obsolescence Part 3: Planned" (with CAFU, in #8, 2012)

=== Marvel Comics ===
- A+X #6, "The Thing + Gambit" (with Stefano Caselli, March 2013) collected in Volume 1: =Awesome, tpb, 144 pages, 2013, ISBN 0-7851-6674-2)
- All-New X-Men/Indestructible Hulk/Superior Spider-Man Team-Up: The Arms of the Octopus (3-issue limited series, with Kris Anka, Jake Wyatt and Michael Dialynas, October 2013, collected in All-New X-Men/Indestructible Hulk/Superior Spider-Man: The Arms of the Octopus, tpb, 96 pages, 2014, ISBN 0-7851-8438-4)
- Scarlet Spiders (limited series, November 2014-January 2015)
  - Spider-Verse (hc, 648 pages, 2015, ISBN 0-7851-9035-X) collects:
    - "The Widow" (with Paco Díaz, in #1, 2014)
    - "The Other" (with Paco Díaz, in #2, 2014)
    - "The Hero" (with Paco Díaz, in #3, 2015)
- Avengers: Millennium (6-issue limited series, with Carmine Di Giandomenico, February–March 2015, collected in Avengers: Millennium, tpb, 136 pages, 2015, ISBN 0-7851-9166-6)
- Spider-Verse vol. 2 (5-issue limited series with Andre Lima Araujo and Steven Sanders, May–September 2015, collected in Spider-Verse: Warzones, tpb, 120 pages, 2015, ISBN 0-7851-9887-3)
- Web Warriors #1-11 (November 2015-September 2016)
  - Volume 1: Electroverse (tpb, 128 pages, 2016, ISBN 0-7851-9672-2) collects:
    - "Static" (with David Baldeón, in #1, 2015)
    - "Charge" (with David Baldeón, in #2, 2015)
    - "Capacity" (with David Baldeón, in #3, 2016)
    - "Resistance" (with David Baldeón, in #4, 2016)
    - "Insulation" (with David Baldeón, in #5, 2016)
  - Volume 2: Spiders Vs. (tpb, 136 pages, 2016, ISBN 0-7851-9673-0) collects:
    - "Nobody Knows Nothing" (with David Baldeón, in #6, 2016)
    - "Tangled States - Part One: Anarchy" (with David Baldeón, in #7, 2016)
    - "Tangled States - Part Two: Technocracy" (with David Baldeón, in #8, 2016)
    - "Tangled States - Part Three: Brave New World" (with David Baldeón, in #9, 2016)
    - "Tangled States - Part Four: Monarchy" (with David Baldeón and Jay Fosgitt, in #10, 2016)
    - "Tangled States - Part Five: Democracy" (with David Baldeón, in #11, 2016)
- Venom vol. 3 #1-6 (November 2016-April 2017)
  - Volume 1: Homecoming (tpb, 136 pages, 2017, ISBN 1-302-90602-X) collects:
    - "Homecoming" (with Gerardo Sandoval, Juanan Ramírez and Iban Coello in #1-6, 2016–2017)
- Venom vol. 1 #150-165 (May 2017 – June 2018)
- Venom: First Host #1-5 (October 2018-November 2018)

=== Avatar Press ===
- God Is Dead #1-48 (with Jonathan Hickman, Di Amorim, Juan Frigeri, German Erramouspe, Omar Francia, Emiliano Urdinola, Michael DiPascale and Nahuel Lopez, September 2013-March 2016)
  - Volume 1 #1-6 (tpb, 160 pages, 2014, ISBN 1-59291-229-X)
  - Volume 2 #7-12 (tpb, 160 pages, 2014, ISBN 1-59291-236-2)
  - volume 3 #13-18 (tpb, 160 pages, 2014, ISBN 1-59291-244-3)
  - Volume 4 #19-24 (tpb, 144 pages, 2015, ISBN 1-59291-252-4)
  - Volume 5 #25-30 (tpb, 160 pages, 2015, ISBN 1-59291-256-7)
  - Volume 6 #31-36 (tpb, 144 pages, 2015, ISBN 1-59291-266-4)
  - Volume 7 #37-42 (tpb, 144 pages, 2016, ISBN 1-59291-271-0)
  - Volume 8 #43-48 (tpb, 160 pages, 2016, ISBN 1-59291-282-6)

=== Boundless Comics ===
- Belladonna #0 (with Ignacio Calero, December 2015)
- Lookers #0 (with Renato Camilo, June 2016)

== Personal life ==
Mike Costa lives in Los Angeles, California where he is a writer and producer on Lucifer.
