= Pandora (comics) =

Publication information
- Publisher: Avatar Press
- First appearance: Pandora #1 (November 1996)
- Created by: William A. Christensen

Pandora is a fictional character created by William A. Christensen, editor-in-chief of Avatar Press comics.

== Background ==
From Avatar Press' site:

Considered by many to be one of Avatar's flagship characters, Pandora was the very first creation published by Avatar Press -- the original Pandora #1, released in November 1996, was Avatar's debut release. Ever since, the mysterious and alluring Girl of Myth has proven to be one of Avatar's most popular and enduring characters, starring in numerous mini-series, specials, Threshold serials, and crossovers (including Pandora/Avengelyne, and Pandora/Razor). Centuries old but with body and spirit as young and strong as the day she was created, Pandora's saga has encompassed a huge variety of stories -- from the epic heights of myth to the horror of the denizens of Hell itself, from the drama of open struggle and war to the furtive intrigue of the conflict with the demons who hide among us, Pandora's story has unfolded with ancient magic and modern science, old enemies struggling in the new world.

== Pandora comics ==
- Pandora #0–2
- Pandora Special
- Pandora: Demonography (drawn by Mike Wolfer, one-shot)
- Pandora: Devil's Advocate
- Pandora: Nudes
- Pandora: Pandemonium
- Pandora Pinup
- Pandora's Chest
- Pandora: Love and War TPB (collection of Pandora stories from Threshold)

Crossovers:

- Pandora/Razor
- Pandora/Shotgun Mary
- Pandora/Widow (written by Mark Seifert, drawn by Mike Wolfer, one-shot)
- Pandora/Widow: Arachnephobia
- Avengelyne/Pandora #1
- Hellina vs Pandora #1–3
- Lady Death: Lost Souls #0–2 (crossover between Lady Death, War Angel, Pandora, and Unholy)
- Lady Death vs Pandora #1
- Threshold #54 & Pandora Annual #1 ("Plague")
- Shi: Pandora's Box

Pandora has also appeared in many issues of Threshold, Avatar Press' anthology comic.
