= War Angel =

War Angel is a fictional character created by Brian Pulido for his new line of post-Chaos comics at Avatar Press. She exists in the same universe as the rest Pulido's new line including Lady Death and Unholy.

== Background ==
War Angel is supposedly thousands of years old, having appeared in the distant future in her own series, and having fought alongside Lady Death in her time. Little is known about her past, but she has no conscience, a quick temper and a taste for mayhem.

== Fictional biography ==
War Angel is, literally, a "war angel", created by God to do one thing: make war.

In the 2005 three-issue mini-series War Angel, set in the future in the year 2232 AD, Serenity (her real name), travels to what is left of Nevada to hide out and get some cash before heading off to Xexico. She gets in the middle of a drug war between vampires, warlocks and werewolves. She kills all parties involved, but doesn't get any money to show for her efforts.

Even though she claims to have no conscience, she seems to have a soft spot for women in peril. She develops feelings for Scarlet, a siren captured by the head of the warlocks named Marax and made into his slave. After Scarlet tells her about being taken from her home and her wives, Serenity kills the warlocks guarding Scarlet so she can escape back to her home known as "The Hive". Scarlet gives Serenity an invitation to come visit her at the Hive if she makes it out of town alive. Serenity takes Scarlet up on her invite and is given shelter and companionship from Scarlet and her wives.

Serenity also tries to help a prostitute she hires for the night whom she calls "Blondie". After surviving an attack by the warlocks, she gives Blondie money and tells her to start her life over, but Blondie is beaten to death inside the brothel by Samuel, the head of the vampire clan.

In 2006, Lady Death vs. War Angel was published, giving a little insight to Serenity's origin. War Angel blames Lady Death for what has happened to her left hand. They fight to a virtual stand still. War Angel slightly gets the upper hand and is about to finish off Lady Death until Pandora intervenes and hits Serenity on the back of her head and teleports her away.

In 2007, War Angel #0 was published, and gave yet more insight into the origin of War Angel. Serenity is upset over the fact that God has not spoken to her in thousands of years (which contributes greatly to her personality) despite having done everything possible to get his attention. Serapiel, the angel of judgement shows up after seeing Serenity tie up a group of angels upside down in order to drink their tears. He brings with him a demon from hell to kill War Angel fearing she is the biggest threat of all. She disposes of them both and starts the great war that leaves the world in ashes.

== Powers, weapons, and abilities ==
War Angel is a fierce warrior who shows absolutely no fear, no matter who the opponent is or how many opponents there are. She almost defeated Lady Death when they battled one on one.

Her left hand has the ability to take the life essence out of anyone she touches with it and absorbs it for herself. She uses this ability to make herself stronger or to heal herself when she's injured. This ability was acquired after she came into possession of the demonography and some of its power seeped into her hand. The flesh on her left hand was eaten away, leaving only the skeleton, covered in flames. She wears an armored glove to protect it until she is ready to use it. The only way she can touch anyone with her left hand without hurting them is to leave the glove on.

On her right hand, she wears a single retractable blade which is at least a foot long. She uses it for hand-to-hand combat.

She also has a retractable set of black wings with which she is able to fly. She can also use her wings as a weapon. In her battle with Lady Death, she was able to slice Lady Death across her stomach with one of her wings while in mid-flight.

Being an angel, she is also immortal, and she is bred to be immune to all types of magic and spells.

== Weakness ==
The only known weakness in War Angel seems to be psychological. Lady Death pointed out during their battle that anytime someone mentions the fact that God doesn't speak to her anymore, she loses focus and is prone to make mistakes.

== War Angel comics ==
- Avatar Press Free ComicBook Day Special
- War Angel #1-3
- War Angel: Book of Death
- War Angel #0 (2007)

Crossovers:

- Lady Death: Lost Souls #0-2 (crossover between Lady Death, War Angel, Unholy, and Pandora)
- Lady Death vs War Angel #1
