= Crécy (comics) =

2007 graphic novel by Warren Ellis

- Cover art for Crécy, by Felipe Massafera
- Date: July, 2007
- Publisher: Avatar Press

Creative team
- Writers: Warren Ellis
- Artists: Raulo Cáceres

Crécy is a graphic novel written by Warren Ellis and illustrated by Raulo Cáceres, depicting some of the events surrounding the historical Battle of Crécy (1346). The graphic novel was published in 2007 by Avatar Press, under the Apparat imprint. The story is told from the point of view of the fictional William of Stonham, a sarcastic and foul-mouthed English longbowman. It features several important characters from the event, including Edward III and Philip VI, the kings of England and France respectively.

== See also ==
V sign, the two-fingered "Longbowman's Salute" described in Crécy, and shown on the cover of the book.
