= Gravel (comics) =

Series of comic book limited series

- Cover of Gravel: Never A Dull Day HC, art by Mike Wolfer.

Character information
- First appearance: Strange Kiss (1999)
- Created by: Warren Ellis; Mike Wolfer

In-story information
- Full name: William Gravel

Publication information
- Publisher: Avatar Press
Title(s)
Strange Kiss
Stranger Kisses
Strange Killings
Strange Killings: Body Orchard
Strange Killings: Strong Medicine
Strange Killings: Necromancer
Gravel
- Formats: Original material for the series has been published as a set of ongoing series and limited series.
- Genre: Horror
- Publication date: November 1999 – present
- Main character(s): William Gravel

Creative team
- Writer(s): Warren Ellis; Mike Wolfer
- Artist(s): Mike Wolfer; Raulo Cáceres

Reprints
- Collected editions
- Never a Dull Day: ISBN 1-59291-050-5
- Bloody Liars: ISBN 159291070X
- The Major Seven: ISBN 1592910823
- The Last King of England: ISBN 1592910823

Gravel is the name given to a series of limited and ongoing series by Warren Ellis, illustrated by Mike Wolfer and published by Avatar Press.

A number of different limited series have been published under the Strange Killings banner, all of which centred on British 'combat magician' William Gravel. Most recently these series were republished under the Gravel name, followed by the launch of a new series, Gravel.

== Publication history ==
Gravel initially appeared in the Strange Kiss limited series, which was followed by a sequel, Stranger Kisses. The third series was titled Strange Killings, which remained the name for the subsequent limited series, until the latest ongoing series called Gravel. With Gravel, Wolfer became the co-author with Raulo Cáceres joining as the first of what has been described as a "revolving team" of artists.

== Collected editions ==
The series have been collected into their own trade paperbacks but there is also a signed limited edition hardcover which collects the older series in one volume:

- Gravel: Never A Dull Day (576 pages, August 2008, ISBN 1-59291-050-5) collects:
  - Strange Kiss (3-issue mini-series, 1999, tpb, 72 pages, 2001, ISBN 0-9706784-0-1)
  - Stranger Kisses (3-issue mini-series, 2001, tpb, 72 pages, 2001, ISBN 0-9706784-4-4)
  - Strange Killings (3-issue mini-series, 2002, tpb, 72 pages, 2003, ISBN 1-59291-000-9)
  - Strange Killings: Body Orchard (6-issue mini-series, 2002–2003, tpb, 144 pages, 2003, ISBN 1-59291-013-0)
  - Strange Killings: Strong Medicine (3-issue mini-series, 2003, tpb, 72 pages, 2004, ISBN 1-59291-024-6)
  - Strange Killings: Necromancer (6-issue mini-series, 2004, tpb, 144 pages, 2006, ISBN 1-59291-033-5)
- Gravel (December 2007 – 2010, 21 issues) collected as:
  - Volume 1: Bloody Liars (collects Gravel #0–7, 192 pages, softcover, March 2009, ISBN 1-59291-069-6, hardcover, May 2009, ISBN 1-59291-070-X)
  - Volume 2: The Major Seven (collects Gravel #8–14, 176 pages, December 2009, softcover, ISBN 1-59291-081-5, hardcover, ISBN 1-59291-082-3
  - Volume 3: The Last King of England (collects Gravel #15–21, 176 pages, February 2011, softcover, ISBN 1-59291-081-5, hardcover, ISBN 1-59291-082-3
- Gravel: Combat Magician (4-issue mini-series, 2013–2014)

== Film ==
A movie adaptation was planned by Legendary Pictures, with Rick Alexander penciled in as producer and Warren Ellis writing the first draft as well as being executive producer. Mike Wolfer was interviewed at New York Comic Con in 2010 and said his preferred actor would be Daniel Craig. Tim Miller was considered to direct the film while Oliver Butcher and Stephen Cornwell had been brought in to work on the script. As of June 2015, no further development on the film has been announced.
