= G.I. Joe: Cobra =

Comic book series

- Cover to G.I. Joe: Cobra #1. Art by Howard Chaykin.

Publication information
- Publisher: IDW Publishing
- Genre: Spy
- Main character(s): Chuckles; Jinx; Tomax and Xamot

Creative team
- Written by: Christos Gage; Mike Costa
- Artist: Antonio Fuso

Collected editions
- G.I. Joe: Cobra: ISBN 978-1-60010-535-7

G.I. Joe: Cobra is a comic book series published by IDW Publishing.

== Publication history ==
=== G.I. Joe: Cobra ===
G.I. Joe: Cobra was originally a four-issue mini-series published in 2009. It details the status quo of Cobra for the continuity by IDW, as G.I. Joe member Chuckles spies on the threat. The story is written by Christos Gage and Mike Costa, and drawn by Antonio Fuso. The covers are illustrated by Howard Chaykin. The plot revolves around Chuckles, the Joes' top undercover agent. He's just infiltrated Cobra, a top secret, highly organized terrorist organization. Chuckles is pulled deeper and deeper into the dark underbelly of Cobra, where one misstep means death, while he tries to pull off the ultimate deception, and bring them down from within.

It was generally well received, and was followed by the one-issue G.I. Joe: Cobra Special, which investigates the relationship of Tomax and Xamot since the events of G.I. Joe: Cobra. The Cobra Special was the recipient of the MTV award for Best One-Shot Issue of 2009.

=== G.I. Joe: Cobra II ===
In 2010, another 4-issue miniseries, G.I. Joe: Cobra II, was published as a direct continuation of the previous Cobra miniseries and one-shot. After its conclusion, the title became an ongoing series with the publication of G.I. Joe: Cobra #5, which continued the storyline of Cobra II, while preserving the numbering of the original Cobra miniseries. Another one-shot was released, G.I. Joe: Cobra Special #2, which explored Erika Le Tene in her new role as the Chameleon. The ongoing series ended with #13.

=== G.I. Joe Cobra: Cobra Civil War ===
G.I. Joe Cobra: Cobra Civil War started in May 2011. It starts after G.I. Joe: Cobra Civil War #0, with the previous Cobra series ending after the death of Cobra Commander. In January 2012, the series will earn an annual titled G.I. Joe: Cobra Annual 2012: The Origin of Cobra Commander, showcasing the origin of the new Cobra Commander. Also in January 2012, the series will become part of a 9-issue crossover with the other two G.I. Joe ongoing series: G.I. Joe and G.I. Joe: Snake Eyes. The crossover is titled Cobra Command.
