= Doktor Sleepless =

Monthly comic book series

- Cover to Doctor Sleepless #6

Publication information
- Publisher: Avatar Press
- Schedule: Irregular (On hiatus since August 2009)
- Format: Ongoing series
- Genre: Biopunk
- Publication date: July 2007 – present
- No. of issues: 13 (as of June 2019)

Creative team
- Created by: Warren Ellis
- Written by: Warren Ellis
- Artist: Ivan Rodriguez
- Letterer: Mark Seifert
- Colorist: Andrew Dalhouse
- Editor: William Christensen

Collected editions
- Engines of Desire (hardcover): ISBN 1-59291-055-6

Doktor Sleepless is a monthly comic book series written by Warren Ellis with art by Ivan Rodriguez, published by American company Avatar Press starting from July 2007. The comic draws from a wide range of ideas – from futurism and transhumanism to corporatism and counter-culture.

According to series writer Warren Ellis, Doktor Sleepless may be a man named John Reinhardt, a trust-fund baby and boy genius who is shunned by the counter-culture he helped found. After disappearing from the city of Heavenside three years ago, he suddenly returns having undergone some changes during the interim. Upon his return, he's transformed himself from a relatively mundane man into what he describes as a "cartoon mad scientist," calling himself "Doktor Sleepless."

Ellis compares the series to his earlier fan-favorite work on Transmetropolitan, published under the DC Comics imprint, Vertigo.

Due to a series of computer difficulties the series, along with other titles Ellis worked on at the time, it was placed on hiatus. Release of new material was planned for early 2012 (after which the book would go on another hiatus), delayed several times, and ultimately failed to materialize.

== Synopsis ==
Set in the near future, this series follows the exploits of John Reinhardt, an enigmatic "mad scientist" whose motivations for returning to Heavenside are shady at best. Since his mysterious disappearance, he has reinvented himself as "Doktor Sleepless" and, to the dismay and utter confusion of the authorities, seemingly rules the airwaves (through his mastery of all things technological) with his thought-provoking, radical rhetoric. He addresses the disenfranchised citizens of Heavenside, acknowledging their disappointment in the "future" they live in. With the resources, knowledge and ambition that John Reinhardt possesses, everyone is listening and watching closely as he represents the one shard of hope everyone is looking for.

It is initially unclear if he works at inciting a truly positive revolution or has much darker, harmful plans for the people of Heavenside, until the sixth issue where he states outright his plans to bring about the apocalypse, using Heavenside as a testing ground. His stated reason is that this is "not the future we were promised... if we can't have that, then we shouldn't have anything at all". It is revealed he is deliberately instigating violence by the grinder counter-culture and is providing them with the means to do so, as well as releasing a bioweapon — "St Theresa's Eyes" — that causes people to "see angels" (actually winged, mechanical constructs which may or may not be hallucinations).

By the eighth issue, he has claimed that the world is merely a source of food for a race of tenth-dimensional animals (based on the Cthulhu Mythos stories) that feed on souls and live in a realm similar to Heaven; he claims these creatures killed his parents and that while he originally wanted to organise people against these creatures, he now just wants to kill the whole world to spite the monsters by starving them.

While Doktor Sleepless gives the impression of being in full control, it is unknown how true this is. He is unaware his companion ("Nurse") murdered an old colleague of his that he intended to contact; directly after outlining his grand scheme, he is shocked when he sees one of the angel constructs himself.

From issue nine on, the series focuses less on the Doktor himself and more on how Heavenside has changed in his wake. It is also revealed that his former caretaker plans not only to kill him but anyone who could spread his ideas. Preston Stoker, the police commissioner, agrees to turn a blind eye to this.

== Issue format ==
At the end of each issue, writer Warren Ellis provides background information on the fictional devices, organisations, technological advancements, etc., used in the narrative, as well as the occasional piece of flash fiction.

All of these things can be recalled and researched in a special "Doktor Sleepless" Mediawiki site.

As with other Avatar titles, each issue comes with a number of variant covers; the majority are by Rodriguez, including a variant displaying a warning sign against things such as "psychoactive air" and "Wavy lines ov deth". Raulo Cáceres produced a wrap-around cover designed to evoke an earlier era, as Ellis said: "Raulo was tasked with producing covers that looked like woodcuts that recalled the late 19th century through to the days of Tesla and James Whale movies."

== Collected editions ==
- Engines of Desire (216 pages, October 2008, softcover, ISBN 1-59291-054-8, hardcover, ISBN 1-59291-055-6)
