= Crossed (comics) =

American comic book (2008–2010)

- Cover of Crossed Volume 1 by Jacen Burrows.

Publication information
- Publisher: Avatar Press
- Schedule: Irregular
- Format: Limited series
- Genre: Horror, post-apocalyptic
- Publication date: September 2008 – March 2010
- No. of issues: 10; 7 (Family Values); 1 (3D); 7 (Psychopath); 100 (Badlands); 94 (Wish You Were Here); 12 (Dead or Alive); 18 (+100)

Creative team
- Created by: Garth Ennis; Jacen Burrows
- Written by: Garth Ennis; Alan Moore; David Lapham; Si Spurrier
- Artist: Jacen Burrows
- Colorist(s): Greg Waller (#0); Juanmar
- Editor(s): William A. Christensen; Ariana Osborne

Collected editions
- Hardcover: ISBN 1-59291-091-2
- Paperback: ISBN 1592910904

Crossed is a horror comic book series written by Garth Ennis and drawn by Jacen Burrows and published by Avatar Press. The comic explores the aftermath of a global pandemic that drives people into a homicidal rage. The infected, referred as the 'crossed', bear a distinctive cross-shaped facial rash. After the series concluded in 2010, the comic was followed by Crossed: Family Values in 2010, Crossed 3D written by David Lapham in 2011, and Crossed: Psychopath also written by Lapham. An anthology series, Crossed: Badlands, was written and drawn by a rotating creative team. The franchise has also spawned two webcomics: Crossed: Wish You Were Here, which ran from 2012 to 2014, and Crossed: Dead or Alive, which began syndication in November 2014.

== Publication history ==
Crossed is a creator-owned series from writer Garth Ennis and artist Jacen Burrows. It began with Crossed #0 on August 27, 2008, and all 10 issues have been released.

The second series, Crossed: Family Values, is written by David Lapham and drawn by Javier Barreno. Ennis described how this unusual situation for a creator-owned property came about:

To be honest, there was never really going to be a volume two – William [Christensen, editor-in-chief/publisher of Avatar] would ask me regularly about the possibility, but apart from one or two vague scenes I pretty soon realised I had no more Crossed stories in me. I didn't want to force the issue, either, because I'm very pleased with Crossed and don't want to dilute it with a sequel that I hadn't the ideas to sustain.

That said, it's pretty obvious that what you have with Crossed is a ready-made fictional world with a good deal of potential for further development, and the Crossed themselves seem to be strong enough villains to maintain an audience. So when William suggested other people doing more I said I wasn't averse to it, so long as a) I thought the creative teams were up to scratch, and b) my own story and characters would be left alone. Which means no sequel, no more Stan, Cindy, Thomas or Kitrick (or Horsecock, Face or Stump, come to that)- just fresh stories set in the same world.

As for David, who better? I think you'll see right from his first episode that he knows exactly what he's doing with the Crossed.

== Synopsis ==
The story follows survivors dealing with a pandemic that causes its victims to turn into bloodthirsty maniacs. Carriers of the virus are generally known as the "Crossed" due to a large, cross-like rash that appears on their faces. While the infected still retain their basic human-level of intelligence, they engage in sadistic killing, raping, cannibalism and maiming themselves for fun.

== Plot elements ==
=== The Crossed Infected ===
The Crossed are practically feral savages with absolutely no regard for their own self-preservation, to the point that they will need sadistic gratification: given that the Crossed are so insane that they will mutilate themselves voluntarily.

As stated by Garth Ennis:

The Crossed are people who – through infection – have given in to the absolute worst instincts that human beings can: murder, rape, torture, cannibalism, all of the most cruel and inventive kind imaginable. They are out of control, really. Their number one urge is to get their hands into normal people and commit every ghastly act they can think of – they can't fight it, and they don't want to.

== Series ==
=== Crossed (Volume One) ===
The first story (Volume One in trade) takes place ten months after the outbreak, with flashbacks to those events, as a small group make their way toward Alaska in the belief that its low population before the outbreak will mean there are fewer Crossed to be avoided, and that the Crossed's gleeful bloodlust hampers their ability to look after themselves. However, they encounter a small group of Crossed who have a degree of self-control and subsequently begin a hunt for the survivors.

=== Crossed: Family Values (Volume 2) ===
In Family Values, the story centers on a religious family who escapes their ranch in Northern Carolina to survive in a mountain compound led by the protagonist Adaline's father, who, while being a strong leader against the Crossed, is a sexual predator who has routinely raped his daughters.

=== Crossed: 3D ===
3D was written with the 3D effect in mind and is not available in a 2D format. The story follows SWAT veteran Lt. Hunt MacAvoy as he leads a rescue mission into the middle of Crossed-infested New York City to rescue a stranded doctor. At 48 pages, the 3D one-shot is about a quarter of the size of one of the collected "Volumes".

=== Crossed: Psychopath (Volume 3) ===
In Psychopath, the story follows a group of survivors who pick up an injured man, Harold Lorre, who understands how the Crossed think and is tracking a specific Crossed group. Lorre is the titular psychopath, who kills members of his group of humans as he deems them problematic, passing the deaths off as the grisly acts of the Crossed. The Crossed group they are tracking killed a woman Lorre had stalked prior to the outbreak and subsequently forced a relationship upon her as they survived. After she was turned into a Crossed and killed, Lorre kept a fragment of her breast in a plastic bag.

The first Crossed Annual spins off from Wish You Were Here, featuring the lifestyle of the psychotic SBS marine Jackson. He appears to be tracking down the scientist who created the Crossed virus, an earlier version of which drove Jackson mad; this is simply a delusion of his, as he'd always been psychotic and the 'weapon' does not exist.

=== Crossed: Badlands (Volumes 4–17) ===
Badlands features shorter story arcs of varying length, by different authors.

Issues #1–3 (Of the World and Its Becoming, by Ennis and Burrows) follow a group of British survivors traveling across Scotland. As they struggle to stay ahead of a horde of Crossed, hoping the harsh conditions of the Scottish mountains will wear down the self-destructive Crossed, the group leader, Ian, reflects on the purpose of survival when there is no hope.

Issues #4-9 (Homo Superior, by Jamie Delano and Leandro Rizzo) follow individual survivors in the Everglades – Steve, a former military woman who has become cruel and sadistic after countless traumas in her past; Greg, a jaded family man who lives off the grid to get away from his dreary home life; Leon, a teenage "swamp rat" living at a fortified "base" with his domineering extended family; and the twins Ashley and Ashlynne, who fled the city after the Crossed outbreak began. The survivors eventually meet and band together, only for their individual psychoses to ultimately cause them all to become Crossed, with Steve infecting herself willingly after realizing that she was barely different from the infected in the first place.

Issues #10–13 (Yellow Belly, by David Lapham and Burrows), a teenage survivor named Edmund (nicknamed Yellow Belly for his cowardice) relates his experience of being at a carnival where the clowns and other workers become infected in the early hours of the outbreak, turning into depraved terror. In issue #13, he crosses paths with Harold Lorre, the main character of Crossed: Psychopath, who encourages Yellowbelly to use the Crossed-infested world as an opportunity to obtain power by force. Ultimately, though, he is killed by a biker woman he fled with, when he confessed his cowardice that resulted in the death of her sister-in-arms.

Issues #14–18 (The Golden Road, written by David Hine) are set just before the outbreak, in the town of Stableford, Wisconsin. The town earned the colloquial nickname "Stumptown" after its residents participated in a mass insurance fraud by "losing" limbs to collect payouts, only for the infamous transgressive writer Gideon Welles to expose their scheme and use the town as inspiration. To add insult to injury, Welles built his massive estate, Samarkand, on the outskirts of the area, separated from the town by a river crossing. The story centers on aspiring writer Clooney and his girlfriend Tabitha, whom Welles invites to Samarkand for a writers' retreat. Unfortunately, Welles is a sadist who demeans, bullies, and psychologically breaks down his guests; worse yet, a horde of Crossed has arrived in town by train. Emasculated and humiliated by Welles' debauched sex orgy with his girlfriend and other guests, Clooney uses the Crossed to turn on his fellow writers, leading to all of them being killed or turned by the horde, with an infected Welles (whose limbs are amputated, leaving just his head and torso intact) crowned by the surviving Crossed. The only survivor is Philly, the young niece of town cop Lorna; she escapes by boat after being forced to kill her aunt, who was infected when a dead Crossed fell on her.

Issues #19–20 (Conquers All, by Si Spurrier (Crossed: Wish You Were Here) and Raulo Caceres (Crossed: Psychopath)) involve Mattias, a former criminal who was turned into one of the Crossed, but still retains a level of self-control and rationality compared to the other Crossed. A paroled enforcer for a local mobster, Mattias fell in love with his parole officer, Serena, and their relationship ended because their duties conflicted with their love. In the present, Mattias travels to the police station to find Serena, only to find she had taken her own life days earlier. After a ketamine-enhanced rampage, he passes out in a parking lot, reawakening with no memory of his search for Serena and repeating his futile journey, implying the cycle has repeated before and will repeat again.

Issues #21–24 (The Livers, by David Lapham and Miguel Garrido) rejoin Amanda, the survivor of David Lapham's Psychopath arc. Having been scarred by her experience with Lorre, she no longer trusts anyone and uses whatever means at her disposal to survive, while paranoia ultimately causes her to kill anyone who takes her in before they can get her. She falls in with The Livers, three survivors that have formed a close bond despite their mutual insanity and occasional cannibalistic tendencies, and finds a new way to survive.

Issues #25–28 (The Fatal Englishman, by Ennis and Caceres) are set five years after C-Day. Four British SAS soldiers (representing each nation of the United Kingdom) go on a suicide mission to break into Porton Down and release the biological weapons, hoping it will wipe out the Crossed but leave enough humans alive for Britain to rebuild and go on an offensive war against the infected. Along the way, they become guardians of a group of children and a Catholic priest, who shares his wisdom with the title character. Eventually, after ensuring the survival of the priest and his flock, they decide against their genocidal plan, instead blowing up the entrance of Porton Down to stop anyone from using its lethal cargo before setting off to make a final stand against the Crossed. However, the leader of the group realizes that he cannot see his friends suffer a grisly end at the hands of the Crossed; thus, he shoots them dead on the way up before confronting a horde of Crossed with nothing but a half-filled pistol.

Issues #29–32 (Quisling, written by Christos Gage) follow Oliver, an anthropologist and self-proclaimed "survivor" who studies the Crossed while doing whatever it takes to prolong his life. While hiding out with a group of survivors, he observes an imposing axe-wielding member of the Crossed, dubbed "Smokey" for his fireman's garb, noting that he seems to have much greater intelligence that allows him to lead his fellow infected (paralleling the character Big Daddy from Land of the Dead). After Smokey's band corners him, Oliver betrays his fellow survivors and strikes a deal with the Crossed, helping them hunt other survivors while hoping to escape or find a group capable enough to fight back. As his guilt grows and rumors of other "Super-Crossed" reach him (featuring a cameo of the twins from the Homo Superior arc), Oliver realizes that Smokey is far too dangerous to leave alive; especially when the Crossed reads his journal and assaults a nuclear base for its weapons. Ultimately, Oliver gives his life to stop Smokey's plans, willingly infecting himself to prevent his "partner" from using him any longer. Enraged, Smokey slaughters his band of Crossed before storming out of the base and heading to Florida to find more "Super-Crossed" like him.

Issues #33–36 (Breakdown, by Lapham and Miguel Ruiz) pick up with Amanda hunting for the Livers and forced to hide from a religiously themed tribe of Crossed pursuing the same prey. She hides in a crawlspace for days, but is devastated when the Crossed bring in her two Liver companions – one captive, and the other infected – and she loses the strength of the delusions they supported. She attempts to re-integrate with another group of survivors, but her growing insanity (represented by hallucinations of Harold Lorre from Psychopath) drives her to kill them all before returning to the crawlspace, determined to remain until she either dies or overcomes her madness.

Issues #37–39 (American Quitters, by Spurrier and Rafael Ortiz) follow the odd couple of a stoned-out hippie and a hardcore biker traveling cross-country to San Diego to die by the ultimate overdose and while exacting revenge on a rival biker gang leader, respectively. Along the way, they pick up a pregnant Mexican woman fleeing from the drug lord father, trying to reach an island sanctuary off the Baja California peninsula. Ultimately, 'no lesson is learned' as all three of them die in unexpected ways; the biker is overrun by Crossed while overdosing on the ultimate high, the hippy is killed fulfilling the biker's revenge, and the pregnant woman is torn apart by her infected relatives on the island.

Issues #40–43 (Gore Angels, by David Hine) look into the broken mind of an abused girl during the early days of the Crossed epidemic in rural Japan. After being drugged, gang-raped, and humiliated on the Internet while in America, Emiko channels her anger and shame into Gore Angels, an incredibly violent manga sold under a pseudonym with the help of her friend Satoshi. By chance, one of her few friends from America comes to Japan with the instigator of the incident (and the latter's girlfriend) in hopes of easing Emiko's pain, but everything goes off the rails when the Crossed begin to emerge...

Issues #44–49 (Grave New World, by Daniel Way and Emiliano Urdinola) follow a group of U.S. Coast Guard personnel who hope to outlast the Crossed by setting out on a boat and finding an island to call home. However, taking on a pair of survivors leads to a whole new array of problems, including a horde of Crossed pirates and the increasingly erratic behavior of their own Captain.

Issues #50–56 (The Thin Red Line, by Ennis and Christian Zanier) reintroduce the four men from The Fatal Englishman, revealing them to have once been security for British Prime Minister Gordon Brown. The story shows the very beginning of the Crossed outbreak, focusing on Britain's efforts to contain the madness and discover its source; however, they soon realize the situation is far worse than they ever imagined.

Issues #57–61 (by Justin Jordan and Georges Duarte) follow Esperanza and Jane, a pair of young women fleeing Alejandro, Esperanza's Crossed brother, and the horde of infectees he commands. They eventually find safe haven at a woodland camp commanded by Sutter, a hardened survivalist with plans of his own that have little to do with the survival of his campmates...

Issues #62–70 (by Lapham and Francisco Manna) concern Gavin Edward Land, a former police detective seeking vengeance against the people who raped and murdered his daughter. As he works through his list and the Crossed outbreak in San Diego, U.S., he learns more than he wants to know when Wentz, his final target, seems to have turned over a new leaf after the apocalypse.

Issues #71–74 (Five Bloody Fingers, written by David Hine) focus on Uboshita Satoshi, Emiko's friend briefly seen in Gore Angels. When C-Day breaks out in Japan, Satoshi sets out to find his blood brothers, the Five Bloody Fingers, and help them survive C-Day. Finding Hazuki, the girl he loves (and one of his blood brothers) turns to be a harder task than he thought, as her father is a yakuza boss who is also on the lookout for her. The friends find themselves making a stand against the Crossed at a Japanese cosplay convention, where their blood oath may be tested with the relentless threat of the Crossed...assuming that Boss Yamada does not first feed them to Usama, his pet lion, in the end all 5 infect each other, renewing their blood oath, becoming infected, and die fighting other Crossed.

Issues #75–80 (Homo Tortor, written by Kieron Gillen) show two simultaneous narratives.

- The main story concerns the attempts of a survivor group, led by college student Washington, to find a possible cure to the Crossed from the notes of Professor Nelson, a man who believed that a race of early humans similar to the Crossed nearly wiped out humanity 75,000 years ago (See the Toba catastrophe theory). Hounded by the Crossed at every turn, Washington's group eventually discovers Professor Nelson's bunker, which contains information about the early humans he dubbed "Homo tortor" ("man who tortures").
- The second narrative goes 75,000 years in the past, where a group of early humans, led by the young hunter Lion, are captured by the "Blood Men" (Homo tortor) after their village is wiped out; they are subsequently brought to the Blood Men's "city of cities" to fight in an arena against men and giant beasts that the Blood Men had collected. When the "festivities" are cut short by a Crossed outbreak, Lion and his group must attempt to survive the ensuing carnage.

Ultimately, Washington discovers that Professor Nelson made up everything about Homo tortor and has become Crossed during the outbreak. Along with his similarly infected assistant (and Washington's college girlfriend), Amy, he wrote the story not to falsify history, but as a vision of the society he intends to create with his band of Crossed.

Issues #81–86 (The Lesser of Two Evils, by Mike Wolfor) begins shortly after C-Day, with a group of survivors stranded on a partially-collapsed overpass. Although they are safe from the lingering Crossed, things begin to unravel after they are joined by Morgan and Olivia, a pair of women who claim to have survived the Crossed due to their "bible": "Surviving D-Day" a best-selling "zombie survival guide" novel (similar to The Zombie Survival Guide).

Issues #87–90 (Shrink, by Max Bemis and Fernando Melek) follow two brothers; the straight-laced psychologist Jack and the hedonistic bully Clancy. As Jack and Tiffany (a close friend of his) prepare themselves for the day the Crossed outbreak finally hits their suburban neighborhood, Clancy crashes by and asks Jack for a favor; after willingly infecting himself with the Crossed plague, he has his brother lock him in the basement and attempt to psychoanalyze his Crossed self, hoping that Jack can learn something of importance about the outbreak and its source.

Issues #91–92 (Anti-Crossed, by Bemis and German Erramouspe) follow a group of 5 survivors, 4 men and a female author named Leigha, as they survive in a barricaded comic book store while struggling with dwindling morale and growing boredom. It is soon revealed that the male survivors – all massive comic book fans – had taken Leigha hostage early in the outbreak, and have since been periodically raping her at gunpoint. Bored, the guys make a deal with Leigha: if she writes them an "Anti-Crossed" comic, they'll stop maltreating her and give her other "privileges." Leigha reluctantly agrees, making a comic that fulfills all of her captor's twisted fantasies, but things may change when two strangers arrive at the store.

Issues #93–99 (by Gage and Fernando Heinz) begins by following a band of survivors led by Cody, an opportunistic man who designed disaster shelters for the elite before stealing one for himself when C-Day hit. His state-of-the-art bunker serves the group well until it runs afoul of Smokey, the "Super-Crossed" last seen in the "Quisling" arc. After being driven out and left at Smokey's mercy, Cody saves himself by offering to help Smokey mold the Crossed into a coherent society, advising him on ways to control their bloodlust and promising fresh victims by breeding uninfected like cattle. When this inevitably fails (in part due to a remorseful Cody sacrificing himself to undo his own work), Smokey seeks out other Super-Crossed like himself, eventually finding the Crossed twins from the Homo Superior arc. With the aid of an uninfected sailor met during the journey for the twins, Smokey establishes a functional homestead of Crossed followers with the aim of outlasting the expected short-lived lifespan attributed to most Crossed.

Issue #100 (also by Gage and Fernando Heinz) follows Smokey and the twins as they try to fulfill the former's dream of ending the Crossed's self-destructive nature. Although they establish a reasonably functional homestead with dozens of followers, Smokey remains depressed and tells an old sailor that it is a far cry from the new society he hoped to create. The children he fathered with the twins also seem no more intelligent than regular Crossed, leading Smokey to believe their species is doomed to die out within a generation. Years later, the aging Smokey kills the old sailor by quickly breaking his neck, sparing him from a slow and painful death at the hands of the other Crossed. Shortly after, Smokey is betrayed and left for dead by the twins and his own son 'Cunt', now revealed to have been a "Super-Crossed" the entire time; the twins explain that they prefer immediate self-indulgence over long-term planning. Smokey survives the attempted assassination by jumping into a river, emerging later and limping off to fight another day with a smile on his face.

== Crossed: Wish You Were Here ==
In the webcomic Crossed: Wish You Were Here (written by Si Spurrier and drawn by Javier Barreno (Vol.1) and Fernando Melek (Vol.2)), former writer "Shaky" (short for Shakespeare) writes in his journal of life on the island of Cava off of the coast of Scotland, where he and a handful of other survivors try to have some semblance of society while desperately trying to keep the wandering Crossed at bay.

== Crossed: Dead or Alive ==
The first series was originally optioned for an independently funded film, with Ennis writing the screenplay. It was going to be financed by Trigger Street Productions and produced by Michael De Luca, Jason Netter, and Kevin Spacey. In the end of 2012, however, Ennis announced that he and Avatar Press had recovered the rights to the franchise. They made plans to launch a series of webisodes in an attempt to generate interest for a feature film. In March 2013 Crossed: Dead Or Alive, an upcoming series of live action webisodes written and directed by Ennis, was announced. DOA will be accompanied by an Ennis-penned tie-in webcomic that expands and further develops the film series' concepts and characters. A goal was set to film all the episodes for Crossed: Dead or Alive season 1 in early 2014.

The webcomic was launched on November 13, 2014, with the plans to start production on the live-action series as soon as the fundraising campaign began to make money.

== Crossed +100 ==
Crossed +100, written by Alan Moore and with art by Gabriel Andrade for the first six issues, debuted in December 2014. It follows a group of humans 100 years after the outbreak. After running into a group of Crossed, they find that the infected have begun multiplying again after nearly disappearing.

== Crossed +100: Mimic ==
A six-issue series (April 2018–October 2018) with story by Christos Gage and art by Emiliano Urdinola, set in the world of Moore's +100. It follows Julie (an uninfected archivist) and Fleshcook (a Crossed raised by one of Beauregard Salt's twelve disciples) as they try to forge an alliance between infected and uninfected. The main story is backed by Crossed +100: American History X, a series of stand-alone stories written by Pat Shand and with art by Raulo Caceres, set at various points in the decades between Crossed and Crossed +100.

== Collected editions ==
Volume	Authors (Writers and pencillers)	Pages	Compilation Published
Crossed: Volume 1 (original run)	Garth Ennis, Jacen Burrows	240 pages	April 27, 2010
Crossed: Volume 2 – Family Values	David Lapham, Javier Barreno	176 pages	September 27, 2011
Crossed: Volume 3 – Psychopath	David Lapham, Raulo Caceres	176 pages	March 27, 2012
Crossed: Volume 4 – Badlands – Collects 1–9 of Badlands Series	Garth Ennis, Jamie Delano, Jacen Burrows	240 pages	October 12, 2012
Crossed: Volume 5 – Badlands – Collects 10–18 of Badlands Series	David Lapham, David Hine, Jacen Burrows	240 pages	March 19, 2013
Crossed: Volume 6 – Badlands – Collects 19–28 of Badlands Series	S. Spurrier, D. Lapham, G. Ennis, R. Caceres, Miguel Ruiz	256 pages	August 20, 2013
Crossed: Volume 7 – Badlands – Collects 29–36 of Badlands Series	Christos Gage, David Lapham, Christian Zanier	192 pages	December 24, 2013
Crossed: Volume 8 – Badlands – Collects 37–43 of Badlands Series and Crossed Annual 2013	Simon Spurrier, David Hine, Rafa Ortiz, G. Erramouspe, Gabriel Andrade	192 pages	March 25, 2014
Crossed: Volume 9 – Badlands – Collects 44–49 of Badlands Series and Crossed Special 2013	Simon Spurrier, Daniel Way, Gabriel Andrade, Emiliano Urdinola	176 pages	June 24, 2014
Crossed: Volume 10 – Badlands – Collects 50–56 of Badlands Series	Garth Ennis, Christian Zanier	176 pages	November 11, 2014
Crossed: Volume 11 – Badlands – Collects 57–61 and Annual 2014 of Badlands Series	Simon Spurrier, Justin Jordan, Rafael Ortiz, Georges Duarte	160 pages	January 27, 2015
Crossed: Volume 12 – Badlands – Collects 62–70 of Badlands Series	David Lapham, German Erramouspe	224 pages	May 12, 2015
Crossed: Volume 13 – Badlands – Collects 71–74 of Badlands Series and Crossed Special 2014	David Hine, Justin Jordan	144 pages	July 15, 2015
Crossed: Volume 14 – Badlands – Collects 75–80 of Badlands Series	Kieron Gillen	160 pages	December 15, 2015
Crossed: Volume 15 – Badlands – Collects 81–86 of Badlands Series	Mike Wolfer	160 pages	February 25, 2016
Crossed: Volume 16 – Badlands – Collects 87–92 of Badlands Series	Max Bemis, Fernando Melek	160 pages	June 7, 2016
Crossed: Volume 17 – Badlands – Collects 93–100 of Badlands Series	Christos Gage, Emiliano Urdinola	176 pages	October 11, 2016
Crossed: Wish You Were Here – Volume 1	Simon Spurrier, Javier Barreno	160 pages	September 25, 2012
Crossed: Wish You Were Here – Volume 2	Simon Spurrier, Fernando Melek	160 pages	May 28, 2013
Crossed: Wish You Were Here – Volume 3	Simon Spurrier, Fernando Melek	144 pages	February 4, 2014
Crossed: Wish You Were Here – Volume 4	Simon Spurrier, Fernando Melek	144 pages	September 23, 2014
Crossed 3D	David Lapham	48 pages	April 19, 2011
Crossed +100 – Volume 1 – Collects 1–6 of the Crossed +100 Series	Alan Moore, Gabriel Andrade	160 pages	October 13, 2015
Crossed +100 – Volume 2 – Collects 7–12 of the Crossed +100 Series	Simon Spurrier, Rafa Ortiz, Fernando Heinz	160 pages	March 22, 2016
Crossed +100 – Volume 3 – Collects 13–18 of the Crossed +100 Series	Simon Spurrier, Rafael Ortiz	144 pages	July 11, 2017

== Film adaptation ==
In August 2024, Six Studios optioned the film rights to the comic, with the screenplay written by Ennis himself. In January 2025, Rob Jabbaz was chosen to direct. On October 8, 2026 Bloody Disgusting Horror’s official YouTube channel and website released an official trailer for the movie with an unspecified release date.
