= Belorussian Front =

Belorussian Front, or Belarusian Front, may refer to several Soviet fronts (army groups) of the Second World War:

- Belorussian Front (1939), formed during the Soviet invasion of Poland (1939)
- 1st Belorussian Front, formed in 1943 and active in the Vistula–Oder Offensive and the Battle of Berlin
- 2nd Belorussian Front, formed in 1944 and active in the East Prussian Offensive and the Battle of Berlin
- 3rd Belorussian Front, formed in 1944 and active in Operation Bagration and the East Prussian Offensive
