= Mike Wolfer =

American comic book writer & artist

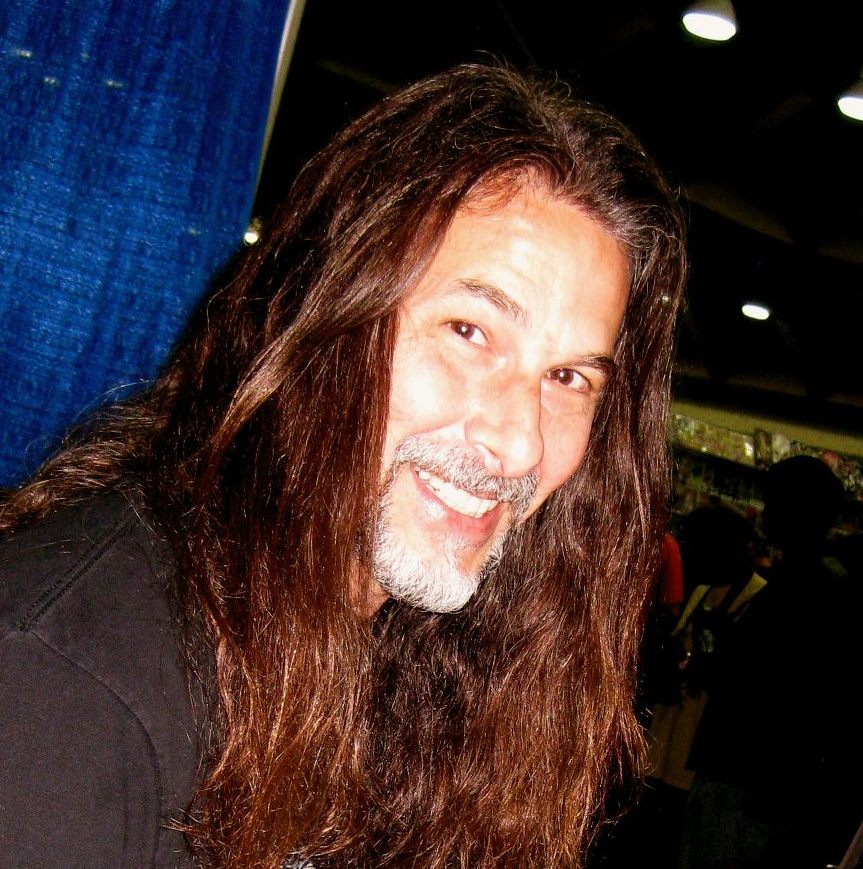
- Areas: Writer, penciled, inker
- Notable works: Lady Death, Night of the Living Dead (comic adaptation) and Gravel

Mike Wolfer is an American comic book writer and artist. He attended The Kubert School for two years.

== Career ==
Wolfer started his career in 1987 by forming his own publishing company, Ground Zero Comics, and self-published "Daikazu" (8 issues) and "Daikazu Vs. Gugoron" (3 issues).

In 1992, Wolfer began publishing "Widow," a horror title that ran a total of 14 issues, through various mini-series: "Widow: Flesh And Blood," "Widow: Kill Me Again," "Widow: Metal Gypsies" and "Widow: Bound By Blood." Simultaneously, Wolfer began freelancing with other companies such as Dark Horse Comics ("Dark Horse Presents," "Godzilla"), London Night Studios ("Razor"), Chaos! Comics ("Lady Death Swimsuit/Lingerie"), Re-Visionary Press' Carnal Comics, and others.

Wolfer soon began writing and illustrating many of Avatar titles, collaborating with many writers including Warren Ellis, Garth Ennis, and Alan Moore. He has worked on horror titles such as "Night of the Living Dead," "Friday the 13th," and "Escape of the Living Dead." His work on supernatural tales continued with his writing credits on Warren Ellis' many "Gravel" comics and Garth Ennis' "Stitched," both of which he also illustrated. Wolfer assumed scripting "Stitched" in September 2012, writing issues #8-19, which were illustrated by Fernando Furukawa. In 2013, he illustrated the four-issue "Skin Trade," the comic adaptation of the George R.R. Martin werewolf epic. He has also worked for Avatar's sister company, Boundless Comics, where he wrote both Brian Pulido's "Lady Death" and "War Goddess."

"Lady Death" was nominated for "Sexist Or Racist Or Homophobic Comic Of The Year" at the 2011 C2E2 Bleeding Cool Awards.

In July 2016, Wolfer began writing an authorized comic book sequel The Land That Time Forgot. The book was drawn by Giancarlo Caracuzzo and published by American Mythology Productions. In the first issue, Wolfer says the publisher approached him to write it because they had heard he was a big fan of the novel by Edgar Rice Burroughs.

== Published work ==
=== Artist and/or Writer ===
- Daikazu (1987-1991 #1-8 'Ground Zero Comics' Written and illustrated by Mike Wolfer)
- Dark Horse Presents (1986 #47 Dark Horse (anthology title)
- Daikazu Versus Gugoron (1991 #1-3 'Ground Zero Comics' Written and illustrated by Mike Wolfer)
- Widow: Flesh and Blood (1992 #1-3 'Ground Zero Comics' Written and illustrated by Mike Wolfer)
- Widow: Kill Me Again (1993 #1-3 'Ground Zero Comics' Written and illustrated by Mike Wolfer)
- Deadworld (1993 #1 New Beginnings and Dead Ends by Caliber Comics)
- Carnal Comics - 1994-1997: Sarah Jane Hamilton, Alicia Rio, Porsche Lynn, Hyapatia Lee
- Lady Death Swimsuit Special (1994 Chaos Comics pin-up edition)
- Brinke of Destruction (1995 #3 Written by Todd A Kaylor and Brinke Stevens for High Top Publications)
- Widow: Metal Gypsies (1995 1#-3 'London Knight Studios' Written and illustrated by Mike Wolfer)
- Fangs of the Widow (1995 #1-14 'Ground Zero Comics' Written and illustrated by Mike Wolfer)
- Godzilla (1995 #8 Written by Arthur Adams Dark Horse Comics)
- Lady Death in Lingerie (1995 Written by Brian Pulido pin-up edition with various artists)
- Razor Swimsuit Special (1995 'London Knight Studios' pin-up edition with various artists)
- Widow / Luxura: Blood Lust Alpha (1996 'Ground Zero Comics' Written and illustrated by Mike Wolfer, oneshot)
- Widow Cinegraphic Special (1996 'Ground Zero Comics' Written and illustrated by Mike Wolfer, oneshot)
- Widow: Bound by Blood (1996 #1-3 'Ground Zero Comics' Written and illustrated by Mike Wolfer)
- Widow The Origin (1997 #1-3 'Ground Zero Comics' Written and illustrated by Mike Wolfer)
- Pandora: Demonography (1997 'Avatar Press' Written by William Christensen, oneshot)
- Dark Horse Monsters (1997 #1 'Dark Horse' Oneshot)
- Pandora/Widow (1997 'Avatar Press' Written and illustrated by Mark Wolfer, oneshot)
- Godzilla: Past, Present, Future (1998 Trade paperback Dark Horse by various)
- Pandora: Nudes (1998 'Avatar Press' Various, oneshot)
- Harpy Pin-Up Special (1998 Peregrine Entertainment, various artists)
- Pandora/Widow: Arachnephobia (1998 'Avatar Press' Written and illustrated by Mike Wolfer)
- Threshold (1998 'Avatar Press' #5, 39 - 44)
- Raw Media Quarterly (1998 'Avatar Press' #1-7 various writers)
- Strange Kiss (1999 'Avatar Press' #1-3 Written by Warren Ellis) (was also reprinted in 2001)
- Widow X (1999 'Avatar Press' #1-14)
- Razor: Till I Bleed Daylight (2000 'Avatar Press' #1 and 2)
- Stranger Kisses (2000 'Avatar Press' #1-3 plus #0 Written by Warren Ellis)
- Strange Killings (2002 'Avatar Press' #1-3 Written by Warren Ellis)
- Strange Killings: The Body Orchard (2002 'Avatar Press' #1-6 Written by Warren Ellis)
- Alan Moore's Yuggoth Cultures and Other Growths (2003 'Avatar Press' #2 By various)
- Strange Killings: Strong Medicine (2003 'Avatar Press' #1-3)
- Yuggoth Creatures (2004 'Avatar Press' #1-3 By various)
- Strange Killings: Necromancer (2004 'Avatar Press' #1-6 By various)
- Escape of the Living Dead: Resurrected (2007 'Avatar Press' #1, oneshot)
- Friday the 13th Special (features Jason Voorhees) (2005 'Avatar Press' Written by Brian Pulido oneshot special)
- Friday the 13th: Bloodbath (2005 'Avatar Press' #1-3 Written by Brian Pulido oneshot special)
- Friday The 13th: Jason Vs Jason X (2006 'Avatar Press' #1-2 written and illustrated by Mike Wolfer)
- Warren Ellis Blackgas (2006 'Avatar Press' #1-3 special Written by Warren Ellis, various covers by Mike Wolfer, with later trade paperback
- Escape of the Living Dead: Airborne (2006 'Avatar Press' #3)
- Escape of the Living Dead: Fearbook (2006 'Avatar Press' #1 oneshot)
- Garth Ennis' Streets of Glory (2007 'Avatar Press' #1-6, later a tradepaper back followed)
- Widow (2007 'Avatar Press' #0)
- 2001 Maniacs Hornbook (2007 'Avatar Press' #1)
- Gravel (2007 'Avatar Press' #8-21)
- Wolfskin Annual (2008) Written by Warren Ellis/Mike Wolfer
- Gravel: Never A Dull Day (2008 'Avatar Press' hardcover Written by Warren Ellis)
- Wolfskin: Hundredth Dream (2010 #1-6) Written by Warren Ellis/Mike Wolfer, art by Gianluca Pagliarani
- Night Of The Living Dead (2010 'Avatar Press' co-written by John A. Russo)
- Night Of The Living Dead (V2) (2010 'Avatar Press' co-written by John A. Russo)
- Night Of The Living Dead Holiday Special (2010 'Avatar Press' Various)
- Night of the Living Dead 2011 Annual (2011 'Avatar Press' Various)
- Stitched (2011 'Avatar Press' #1-7 and trade paperback back Written by Garth Ennis, art by Mike Wolfer)
- Stitched (2011 'Avatar Press' #8-19 and trade paperback back written by Mike Wolfer, art by Fernando Furukawa)
- Night of the Living Dead: Day of the Undead (2012 'Avatar Press' tradepaper Collects other Night of the Living Dead Specials)
- Skin Trade (2013 'Avatar Press' #1-4 Written by Daniel Abraham and George Raymond Richard Martin, mini-series)
- Gravel: Combat Magician (2014 'Avatar Press' #0-4 Written by Mike Wolfer)
- The Curse Of Ragdoll (2014) Story and art by Mike Wolfer, lettering by Natalie Jane, cover color by Ceci de la Cruz.
- The Land That Time Forgot (2016 'American Mythology Productions' #1-ongoing Written by Mike Wolfer)

=== Inker ===
(Excluding titles, Wolfer did pencils)

- Faust/777: The Wrath (a.k.a. Darkness in Collision) (1998 'Avatar Press' #4)

=== Editor ===
Fangs of the Widow ('Avatar Press' 1995)

=== Cover art ===
(Excluding titles, Wolfer did interior art)

- George R.R. Martin's Fevre Dream (2006)
- Rawbone ('Avatar Press' 2009 #2 Written by Jamie Delano with interior art by Max Fiumara and Ryan Waterhouse)
- Crossed: Wish You Were Here - Volume 1 ('Avatar Press' 2012) Promotional work at Phoenix Comicon
