= Bad girl art =

Comic book trend of the 1980s/90s

- Lady Death, created by Brian Pulido
- Authors: Brian Pulido; Everette Hartsoe; Billy Tucci
- Publications: Lady Death; Razor; Shi

Related genres
- Good girl art

Bad girl art is a superheroine artwork style trend that emerged in the early 1990s, when comics with female antagonists or anti-heroes as lead characters surged in popularity. Characters of this style are often depicted in revealing clothing.

== History ==
The term "bad girl art" was coined in the 1990s as an allusion – and contrast – to the "good girl art" movement that started in the 1940s, and is used to refer to the trend of femme fatale heroines that started in the early 1990s. The "bad girl" art trend was derived from the exaggerated visual styles of the male and female form first used in the late 1980s by artists such as Rob Liefeld and Jim Lee. The precursors to the trend were Vampirella, created by Forrest J Ackerman and publisher James Warren in 1969, and Marvel Comics' Elektra, created by Frank Miller in 1981.

Part of the impetus for the "bad girl" trend may have been attributed to Harris Comics revival of Vampirella. As the comic book industry had long held the belief that female-fronted books were not successful, retailers ordered very few issues expecting the Vampirella book to bomb, but due to an influx of longtime Vampirella fans jumping at the chance to read a new series featuring the character this led to a massive spike in prices for back issues. This led to Harris Comics debuting the Vengeance of Vampirella to continued commercial success. Additional momentum for the trend came about from Lady Death, created by writer Brian Pulido and artist Steven Hughes in 1991. Although the Lady Death had amassed a sizable underground following from her appearances in back-up features in Chaos! Comics' Evil Ernie, the character's breakout would only occur in January 1994 in the first issue of her self titled ongoing series which like the Vampirella revival was greatly underestimate by retailers leading to a spike in back issue prices and increased orders for subsequent issues.

Other notable "bad girl" characters in the 1990s include Razor, created by Everette Hartsoe in 1992; Shi, created by Billy Tucci in 1993; Angela, created by Neil Gaiman in 1993; Glory and Avengelyne, created by Rob Liefeld in 1993 and 1995 respectively; and Witchblade, created by Marc Silvestri in 1995.

"Bad girl" characters dress in revealing costumes, possess shapely physiques, are morally ambiguous, wield supernatural powers or are of a supernatural nature, and have no compunction about killing their enemies. The "bad girl" fad even carried influence in more mainstream books like DC Comics ongoing Catwoman series, which while still falling within the aesthetics and stylistic leanings of the Batman family of books, incorporated aspects such as emphasized sexuality and a morally ambiguous heroine. Lady Death creator Pulido attributed the success of the Bad Girl style (though disagreeing with name applied) to a kind of synergy which was achieved with Lady Death, Shi, and Vampirella being released within such close proximity of each other.

== Reception and criticism ==
Prior to the publication of Shi, Lady Death, and the Harris Comics relaunch of Vampirella, many of the creators were routinely told by figures in the industry that "girl books don't sell". John Byrne, who was writing for Wonder Woman at the time, expressed skepticism on the longevity of the "bad girl" books beyond a short-term fad, acknowledging the need and under served audience for strong female characters but felt the "bad girl" books were over reliant on shock value in place of actual substance. Conversely, Jo Duffy who worked on the Catwoman alongside penciller Jim Balent and inker Dick Giordano commented:

I think it is so incredibly fantastic. I have always loved characters like Sue Storm, [AKA] the Invisible Woman, who's such a good mommy, but I've always hated that that's all we really got. [I hated the fact] that bad girls had to be villains and we could never do a bad girl as a protagonist. I think rotten women are a lot [more vicious] than rotten men - they're sneakier, and most of them have a lot more imagination and better clothes.

Colleen Doran admitted to liking some of the characters of the "bad girl" trend whilst also critiquing the misogynistic and exploitative aspects of the trend, but did not fault the publishers of these books as it just made sense from a business perspective.

Mantra creator Mike W. Barr hypothesized that the "bad girl" trend could be interpreted as having a degree of feminism, but also theorized that the trend could be more psychological as with Generation X experiencing the breakdown of nuclear family dynamics in favor of being raised by single mothers that modern readers were simply more accepting of a woman in a position of authority.

== See also ==
- Girls with guns
- Modern Age of Comic Books
- Pin-up girl
- Portrayal of women in American comics
