= Razor (character) =

Fictional character

Razor is a comic book character from the London Night Studios series Razor. She was introduced in Razor #1 in October 1992, by writer/creator Everette Hartsoe.

== Fictional character biography ==
Initially a victim of both of her father and her sister's deaths, the young Nicole Mitchell vowed to clean up the scum of Chinatown by herself as the superheroine Razor, named for the blades she wears on her arms, which evidently brings her into the eye of Roman Van Drake, the man who destroyed her family. In a twist of fate, it is revealed that not only is Nicole's sister, in fact, alive, but also she is Drake's favorite assassin, Stryke. In a play of power, Drake sends Stryke after Razor, who in the following battle comes to the conclusion that Razor is her sister. Angered at Drake's treachery, Stryke kills him, hoping to reconnect with her sister. But when Nicole shuns her like a stranger, Stryke kills her out of anger. Eventually resurrected by her descendant Poizon, Razor is called upon once again to battle with the newly resurrected Drake, alongside her sister Stryke, and Poizon, herself.

In a four-issue series, published from April to September 1998, Razor teamed with James O'Barr's Eric Draven character from The Crow in The Crow/Razor: Kill the Pain. In October, a #0 issue followed. In January 1999, a magazine titled The Crow/Razor: Nocturnal Masque, featuring artwork of both characters and quotes attributed to each was released. In the following month, two additional issues titled, The Crow/Razor: Kill the Pain: Finale and The Crow/Razor: The Lost Chapter were published.

== Powers and abilities ==
Prior to her death, Razor was shown as a capable martial artist and gymnast who usually carried a pair of bladed wrist gauntlets.

After death, the blades were surgically inserted into Razor's arms and painfully extend from her flesh.

== Creation and reception ==
Hartsoe first published Razor after founding London Night Studios with $1200 that he received in an income tax refund. With the book's violent content and "pin-up friendly" artistic style, Razor is often considered part of the "bad girl" genre that rose in popularity during the early-mid-1990s. Razor Annual #1, published in 1993, contained the first appearance of Shi. Writer-artist Eric Powell's first paid job in comics was drawing three issues of Razor. The series also featured early artwork by Georges Jeanty. She had a Swimsuit Special in 1995 (a pin-up edition with various artists including Mike Wolfer).

== Film adaptation ==
In 2009 Arclight Films and Jeff Most Prods. partnered to produce a live-action film based on the Razor series, with Jeff Most and Gary Hamilton producing. The adaptation, for which filming was planned to begin in Australia in 2010, was reported to have a $15 million budget. During the 2017 Cannes Film Festival, Rob Cohen was attached to write and direct the film, with Emma Dumont as the lead character.

== Bibliography ==
- Razor #1–12, 0, ½, Annual (1991–1994)
- Razor: Uncut #13–51 (1995–1999)
- Razor: The Suffering #1–3 (1994–1995)
- Razor: Burn #1–5 (1995)
- Razor: Cry No More (1995)
- Razor: Torture #1–7 (1995)
- Razor #1–7, Annual (1996–1997)
- Darque Razor #1–4 (1997–1998)
- Razor: Gothic #1–4 (1998)
- Razor: The Darkest Night (1999)
- Razor's Edge #1–6 (1999)
- Razor: The Ravening (1999)
- Razor: Till I Bleed Daylight (2000)
- Razor: The Furies (2000)
- Razor: Bleeding Heart (2001)
- Razor X #1–2 (2002)
- Razor X: Requiem (2004)

=== Crossovers ===
- Razor/Dark Angel: The Final Nail (1994)
- Razor and Shi Special (1994)
- Razor/Morbid Angel: Soul Search (1996)
- Razor/Warrior Nun Areala: Faith (1996)
- Sade/Razor (1996)
- Warrior Nun Areala vs. Razor (1996)
- Razor/Embrace (1997)
- Razor/Switchblade Symphony (1997)
- The Crow/Razor: Kill the Pain #0—4 (1998)
- Pandora/Razor (1999)
- Razor/Warrior Nun/Poizon (1999)
- Razor and Warrior Nun Areala: Dark Prophecy #1—4 (1999)
- Warrior Nun Areala/Razor: Revenge (1999)

=== Pinup comics ===
- Razor Swimsuit Special (1995)
- Razor and the Ladies of London Night (1997)
- Razor: Pictorial (1997)
