= Aetheric Mechanics =

2008 graphic novella by Warren Ellis

- Date: October 2008
- Publisher: Avatar Press

Creative team
- Writers: Warren Ellis
- Pencillers: Gianluca Pagliarani

Original publication
- Language: English
- ISBN: 1592910483

Aetheric Mechanics is a graphic novella created by Eagle Award-winning writer Warren Ellis. It is 48 pages long, illustrated in black and white by Gianluca Pagliarani, and was published by Avatar Press in October 2008.

== Plot ==
Aetheric Mechanics is set in an alternate history March 1907, where steampunk technology is advanced far beyond the technology of the modern real world, including two-way television communications, air- and spacecraft powered by reactionless drives, and large combat mecha. The British Empire (which in this setting, includes realms on other planets) is engaged in a war against Ruritania. The war is not going favourably for Britain, but the British government is covering up just how badly the war is going, including the fact that Ruritania is preparing an invasion of Britain.

Dr. Robert Watcham, a captain and doctor in the British army on the French front, returns to London at the start of the story after his tour of duty is over. His friend, roommate, and colleague, Sax Raker, is the greatest detective in London, and one of the finest minds in Britain, with Watcham having written a number of exploits about him for the popular press. At the time of Watcham's return, Raker has been commissioned by Inspector Jarratt of Scotland Yard to investigate another case. A number of observers witnessed a spectral figure, flickering in and out of existence, murdering an engineer specialising in aetheric mechanics outside of the Royal Society, with several others having gone missing.

Investigating outside the Society, Raker notices traces of mud beneath the victim, then is drawn to a figure standing in the crowd. Raker reveals it to be none other than his persistent rival, Inanna Meyer, whom Watcham (in a period of narration) notes that Raker is obsessed with but is unable to face that fact. Originally surmising that Inanna was hired by the Ruritanian government to destabilise Britain's vital science and engineering community, she reveals that she is now working for the British government: Raker's brother, Dunmow, recruited her into the British Secret Service, and she was also investigating the murder.

With that piece of information, Raker is able to solve the case, deducing that the mud near the victim came from the River Fleet. He therefore surmises that a villain has been kidnapping scientists to create some type of weapon directly beneath London, and the murder was done to silence a failed kidnapping. Raker, Watcham, and Inanna head into the River Fleet's underground channel as the Ruritanian aeroplanes begin a heavy fire-bombing of London in preparation for their final assault on Britain.

Beneath London, they indeed find a large colony of kidnapped scientists, now escaping from the Ruritanian bombing. The "man who wasn't there" is also found, and identifies himself as Jonathan Vogel. Vogel explains that he is actually from the future, and that the reason he is fading in and out if existence is due to an accident he experienced. Vogel was a scientist working on an addition to the Large Hadron Collider which would have enabled ansible-like communication with a space probe being sent to Pluto using a quantum string. However, the "other" end of the string became loose, fixing onto 1905 – the year the special relativity was proposed by Albert Einstein, thus eliminating the theory of aether that had been held before. Vogel was sent back through time, along with his personal handheld computer – containing, among other things, the stories of Sherlock Holmes and Sexton Blake, The Prisoner of Zenda, and a number of old movies and Japanese anime.

Vogel explains that, to 'bridge' between the two realities, the stories contained in his handheld were merged with the real-world 1905, creating the world of Aetheric Mechanics – and that neither Sax, nor Watcham, nor Inanna, nor Ruritania were real. Vogel states that the flickering is him being stranded between two worlds, and he has constructed a computer which, within a few hours, will finish its calculation to repair the damage caused to time, allowing Vogel to return home by destroying the fictional world he created.

Seeing that as a chance to prevent Britain's destruction by Ruritania, Inanna and Watcham agree to let Vogel continue. They do not notice that Raker is horrified and outraged at the thought of not existing. Raker removes his pistol and shoots Vogel in the chest, killing him. He explains that he has finally realised the one thing he can't do: bear to think of a world where Inanna doesn't exist. Leaving Inanna and Watcham dumbstruck behind him, Raker races back through the tunnels below London, promising that using his intellect, he will still manage to find a way to prevent Britain from losing the war.

== See also ==
- Anno Dracula series
- The League of Extraordinary Gentlemen
- Scarlet Traces
- The Time Ships
