= Adaro (mythology) =

Mythological beings of the Solomon Islands

Adaro is a term for two distinct classes of beings found in the mythology of Makira, one of the Solomon Islands. The first class is that of ghosts, which may enter an animal, tree, or stone, or remain in the village where they had lived. With the proper entreaties, these ghosts can be commanded to kill or maim living people at a distance. The other class is of elemental spirit who plays a part in many creation stories around the island.

== The name ==
The word adaro is from the Arosi language; it has several meanings, including 'corpse; ghost; soul; spirit'. The Makira conceive of two souls within all people, a malignant soul -- the adaro -- and a benevolent soul -- the aunga. The aunga passes from this world after death, while the adaro remains.

== Characteristics ==
Adaro (ghosts) most often enter into sharks or other marine animals. These animals take on human understanding and are able to help their living relatives. Shark-adaro will grab a victim from their canoe, and drag them, still alive, to the adaro's relatives, while a snake-adaro may coil in a victim's hut, taking their aunga as they dream and causing them to sicken and die.

Adaro (spirits) inhabit many of the elemental forces in and around the island of Makira. One may talk of the adaro of the sea, and adaro of the rainbow, among others. These adaro play a part in the creation stories of various matrilineages. There is an adaro who guards and an adaro who rules the Rotomana, the place where the aunga go upon death. The Rotomana exists in different places for different people of the island of Makira. The Olu Malau Islands are the Rotomana for many of those living on the north shore of Makira, while islands in the Marau Sound are considered the Rotomana for those living on the western coast.
