= Courtyard (disambiguation) =

A courtyard is a circumscribed area.

Courtyard may also refer to:

- Courtyard by Marriott
- Courtyard house
- Courtyard housing
- Courtyard (solitaire)
- Courtyard Theatre, Stratford-upon-Avon, Warwickshire, England
- Courtyard Theatre, London, England
- Courtyard, Hereford, a theatre and arts venue in Hereford, England
- Courtyard Crisis
- Alan Moore's The Courtyard, a two-issue comic book mini-series
- Courtyard Shopping Centre, a retail complex in County Donegal, Ireland
- Courtyard (film), a 1931 Italian drama film
