= Stefanos Polyzoides =

Greek American architect and urban planner

- Στέφανος Πολυζωίδης
- Born: February 16, 1946 (age 80); Athens, Kingdom of Greece (now Athens, Greece)
- Education: Princeton University
- Occupations: Architect; Urban Planner
- Organization: Moule & Polyzoides
- Style: New Urbanism
- Spouse: Elizabeth Moule

Stefanos Polyzoides (born February 16, 1946, in Athens, Greece) is an architect and urban planner based in Pasadena, California, United States. He received his undergraduate and master's degrees in architecture and urban planning from Princeton University.

He is often noted as the “Godfather of New Urbanism.

== Background ==
Polyzoides is a co-founder of the Congress for the New Urbanism and, with his wife Elizabeth Moule, a partner in Moule & Polyzoides, a Pasadena, California practice since 1990.

Polyzoides' prominent career covers the areas of architectural and urban design education, design and execution, and theory. His professional experience spans educational, institutional and civic buildings, historic rehabilitation, commercial projects, housing, campus planning, and urban design. From 1973 until 1997, he was Associate Professor of Architecture at the University of Southern California and has been Visiting Professor at several prestigious schools of architecture. From 1983 through 1990, he was on the Advisory Board for the School of Architecture at Princeton University. Polyzoides is a popular speaker on the subjects of new urbanism, transit-oriented development, mixed use development, housing and sustainability and is a frequent guest at academic symposia.

== Projects ==
Architectural and Urban Planning Projects overseen by Stefanos Polyzoides

== Publications ==
The publication of Polyzoides’ book Courtyard Housing in Los Angeles preceded the re-emergence of the Courtyard housing typology in recent years. He is also the co-author of Los Angeles Courtyard Housing: A Typological Analysis (1977), The Plazas of New Mexico (2012), and the author of R.M. Schindler, Architect (1982), and the forthcoming Between House and Tower: The Architecture of Density. He also led on the production of four distinguished exhibitions and exhibition catalogs on the architectural and urban history of Southern California: Caltech: 1910–1950, Myron Hunt: 1868–1952, Wallace Neff, and Johnson, Kaufmann & Coate.
