= Moule & Polyzoides =

Moule & Polyzoides, Architects and Urbanists is an architecture and urban planning firm based out of Pasadena, CA founded in 1990 by partners Elizabeth Moule & Stefanos Polyzoides.

== Background ==
The firm was founded "to address the emerging challenge of our time: creating timeless and sustainable buildings, campuses, neighborhoods and towns for current and future generations." Moule & Polyzoides is often sought after for their work in both rethinking urban centers as well as creating residential complexes centered around courtyards.

The firm's Pasadena office is located in a building previously occupied by Wallace Neff and Frederick Ruppel which Neff designed in the late 1920s and Moule & Polyzoides rehabilitated in 1998.

In 2015 Moule & Polyzoides was honored by The Institute of Classical Architecture and Art for excellence in the classical tradition with the 2015 Arthur Ross Award for Community Design and City Planning. The firm was also recognized at the 2015 CNU Charter Awards for 30 Years of Scripps College Campus Stewardship.

== Principles ==
In 1991, firm partners Elizabeth Moule and Stefanos Polyzoides were part of a group of architects and urbanists invited by the Local Government Commission to develop a set of community principles for land use planning along with a panel of architects, called the Ahwahnee Principles.

Building upon their work for the LGC, Moule and Polyzoides (along with Peter Calthorpe, Andrés Duany, Elizabeth Plater-Zyberk, and Daniel Solomon) co-founded the Chicago-based Congress for the New Urbanism in 1993 to further urbanist advocacy domestically and abroad and was the first to articulate many of the ideas that now pervade planning in many cities. Since its founding, the CNU has grown to more than 3,000 members, and is the leading international organization promoting New Urbanist design principles through education, legislation, planning, and architectural practice.

== Projects ==
- Natural Resources Defense Council Robert Redford Building (2003) – The LEED Platinum certified Santa Monica, CA offices of the NRDC which is often called “the greenest building in America.”
- Del Mar Station (2006) – An award-winning transit-oriented development in Pasadena, CA
- Civano New Town (2001) – A sustainably planned neighborhood located near Tucson, Arizona
- The Seven Fountains (2002) – At the time of completion, the first new courtyard complex built in Los Angeles in 70 years. The project was also selected to receive the 2002 Charter Award from the Congress for the New Urbanism.
- Playhouse Plaza (2014) – A 145,000-square foot mixed-use development located in Pasadena's historic Playhouse District
- New College of Florida Master Plan (2008) - Sarasota, Florida
- Gartz Court (1984) – A joint project commissioned by Pasadena Heritage and the City of Pasadena engaged Moule & Polyzoides to design the restoration and expansion of historic Gartz Court, which also included moving the structures almost three miles from their original location.
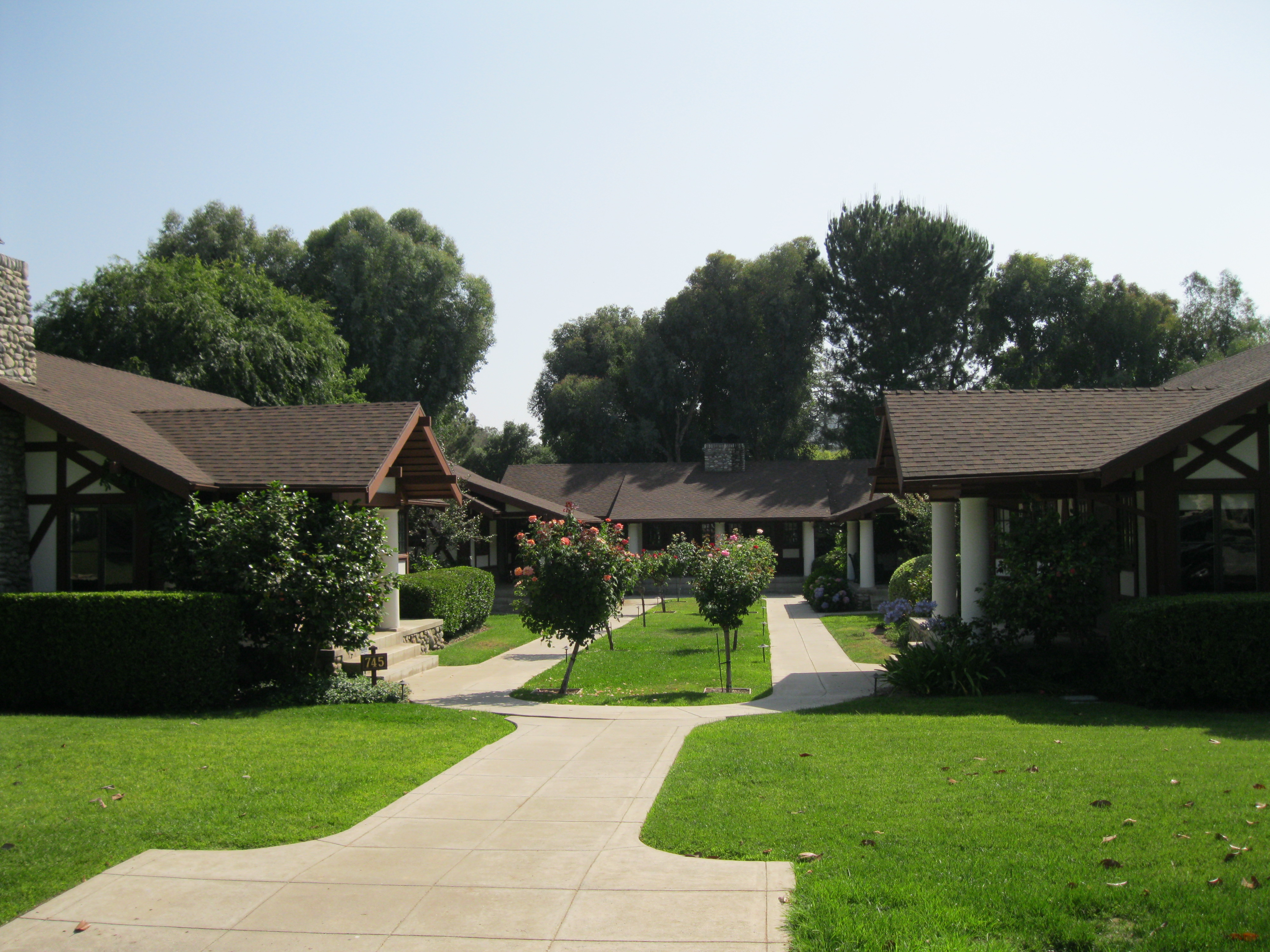
  Gartz Court in its new location after restoration.
- Mercado Neighborhood (2006) – A 14-acre district located near Downtown Tucson, Arizona recognized in 2006 with the CNU Charter Award
- The BLVD (2010) – A one-mile revitalized stretch of Lancaster Boulevard between 10th Street West and Sierra Highway in Lancaster, CA
- Los Poblanos Inn (2011) – A transformation of Los Poblanos in Albuquerque, New Mexico into a country inn, conference center and sustainable farm which solved the complex preservation and development pressures that faced the historic structures.
- Armenian genocide memorial (2015) – Located in Pasadena's Memorial Park and installed to commemorate the 100th anniversary of the Armenian genocide.
- Scripps College New Residence Hall (2016) – A $10 million residence hall slated for completion in fall of 2016 which will afford more students the benefits of residential campus life.
- St. John's Seminary Development (2014) – A redevelopment of the old St. John's Seminary site adjacent to Mission Concepción that would bring 200 apartments to the South Side neighborhood in 2016.

== Achievements ==
- 2015 ICAA Arthur Ross Award for Community Design/Civic Design/City Planning
- 2012 EPA Smart Growth Award for Overall Excellence – Lancaster, Blvd transformation project.
- 1998 Seaside Prize – an award given annually by the Seaside Institute to acknowledge those who had made great strides in moving the New Urban movement forward.
- CNU Charter Awards

- 2002 – Harper Court / Seven Fountains
- 2003 – Doña Ana Historic Plaza Reconstruction & Del Mar Station
- 2004 – NRDC Robert Redford Building
- 2006 – Mercado Neighborhood & Mission Meridian Village
- 2009 – San Antonio River North District Master Plan
