= Aklo =

Fictional Language

- Created by: Arthur Machen
- Date: c. 1899
- Setting and usage: A fictional language featured in The White People, Cthulhu Mythos, The Illuminatus! Trilogy, among others
- Purpose: constructed languages: artistic languages; fictional languages; Aklo
- Writing system: Latin, unspecified Aklo alphabet

Language codes
- ISO 639-3: None (mis)

Aklo is the name of a fictional language that has been used by many authors from its first reference in 1899. In the stories the language features in, it is said to have mystical powers.

== History and uses ==
Aklo was first mentioned by Arthur Machen in his 1899 story "The White People". Aklo was mentioned but not described in detail by Machen, being noted in passing by the story's narrator as part of a secretive game or ritual.

H. P. Lovecraft admired the Machen story, and used Aklo in his Cthulhu Mythos stories "The Dunwich Horror" and "The Haunter of the Dark". The authors who have used Aklo have played into the fiction that the language has magical powers, and so have not included much detail to prevent "some careless reader from incant[ing] a spell capable of calling forth evil".

In The Illuminatus! Trilogy by Robert Shea and Robert Anton Wilson, Aklo appears as a language used in Black Masses and by the Illuminati.

Alan Moore later used Aklo in his Lovecraft tribute short story and 2003 comic The Courtyard, in his 2010 comic Neonomicon and again in Providence. In his adaptation, Aklo is not just an alien language, but a key that opens doors inside the human mind which is "connected to Moore's general view on actual magic and the role of words in modifying a human's perception of reality."

The Pathfinder RPG, published by Paizo, uses Aklo as the language of several subterranean, otherworldly, or otherwise Lovecraftian species in the game's universe, such as aboleths, gibbering mouthers, and shoggoths.
