= Mews =

Type of housing above stables

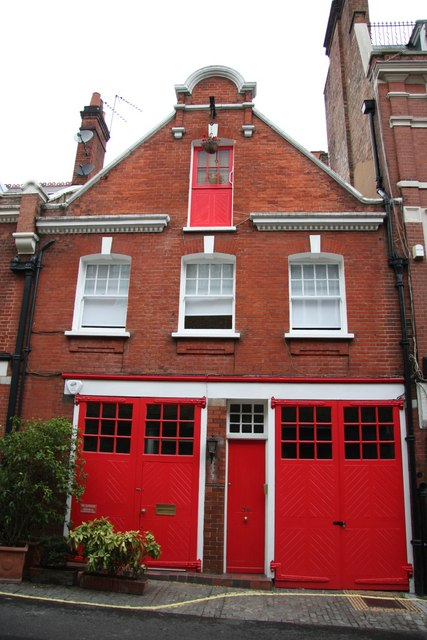
A mews house. Third of three identical buildings, Bruton Place, formerly North Bruton Mews, off Berkeley Square, Mayfair, London W1. The winch for horse feed is visible in front of the attic door

A mews is a row or courtyard of stables and carriage houses with living quarters above them, built behind large city houses before motor vehicles replaced horses in the early twentieth century. Mews are usually located in residential areas, having been built to cater for the horses, coachmen and stable-servants of prosperous residents.

The word mews comes from the Royal Mews in London, England, a set of royal stables built 500 years ago on a former royal hawk mews. The term is now commonly used in English-speaking countries for city housing of a similar design.

After the Second World War, mews were replaced by alleys and the carriage houses by garages for automobiles.

== Hawk mews ==
Mews derives from the French muer, 'to moult', reflecting its original function to confine a hawk to a mews while it moulted. William Shakespeare deploys to mew up to mean confine, coop up, or shut up in The Taming of the Shrew: "What, will you mew her up, Signor Baptista?" and also Richard III: "This day should Clarence closely be mewed up".

The term mews is still used today in falconry circles in English-speaking countries to refer to the housing of the birds of prey used in falconry.

From 1377 onwards, the king's falconry birds were kept in the King's Mews at Charing Cross.

== Mews stables ==
The first recorded use meaning stables is dated 1548, after the royal stables were built at Charing Cross, on the site of the royal hawk mews. Those royal stables moved to Buckingham Palace Road in 1820. There were also royal mews at St James's Palace.

The name mews was taken up for domestic stables in the city during the 17th century. The 18th-century Washington Mews in Greenwich Village, New York City, matches the London buildings in period, purpose and name.

"Mews" has since been applied to any stable buildings in any space, lane, alley or back street onto which these buildings open, and to any new residential buildings of similar character throughout the English-speaking world that have motor vehicles taking the place of horses and carriages.

== Description ==
=== London ===
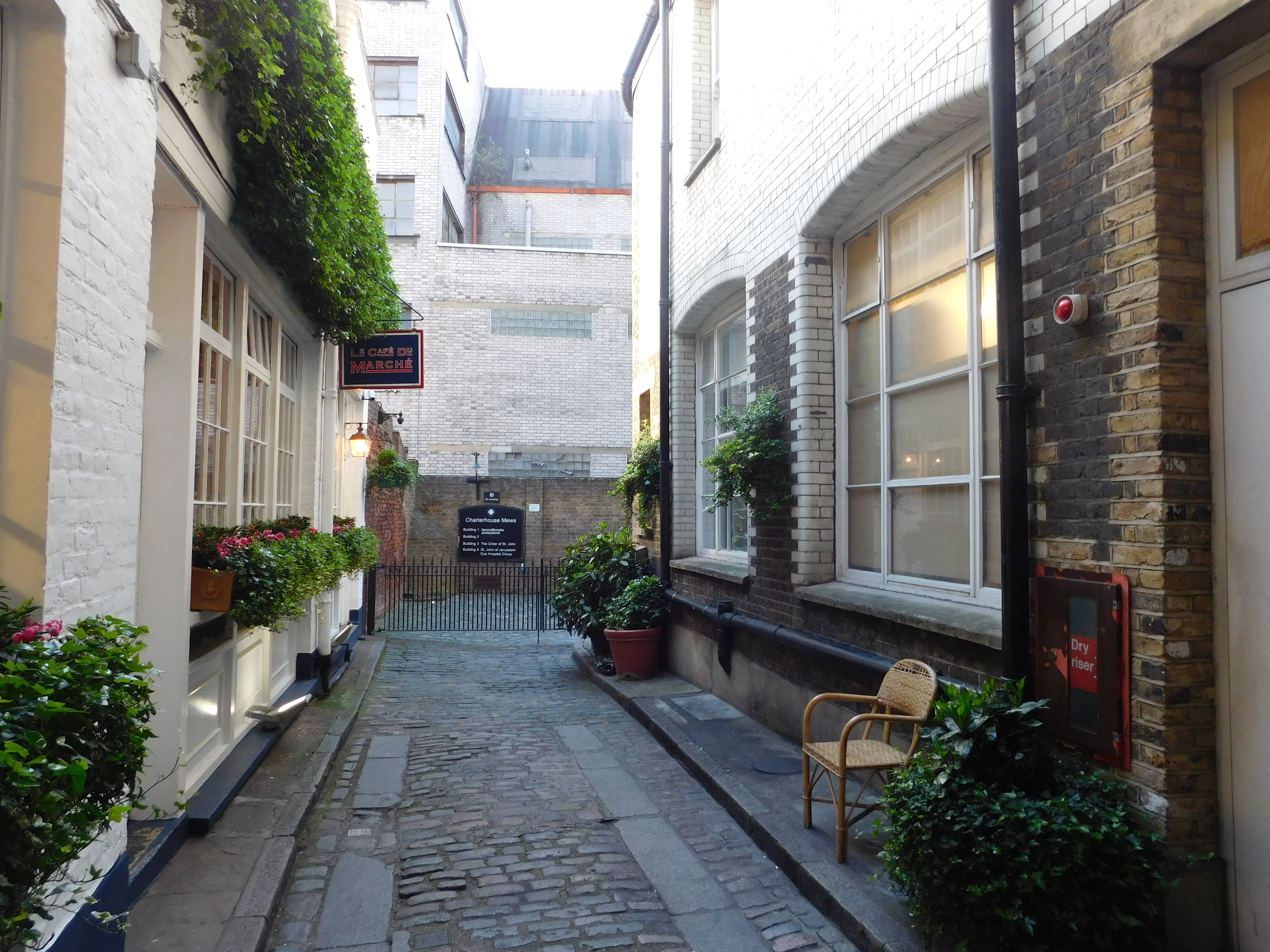
Charterhouse Mews, London

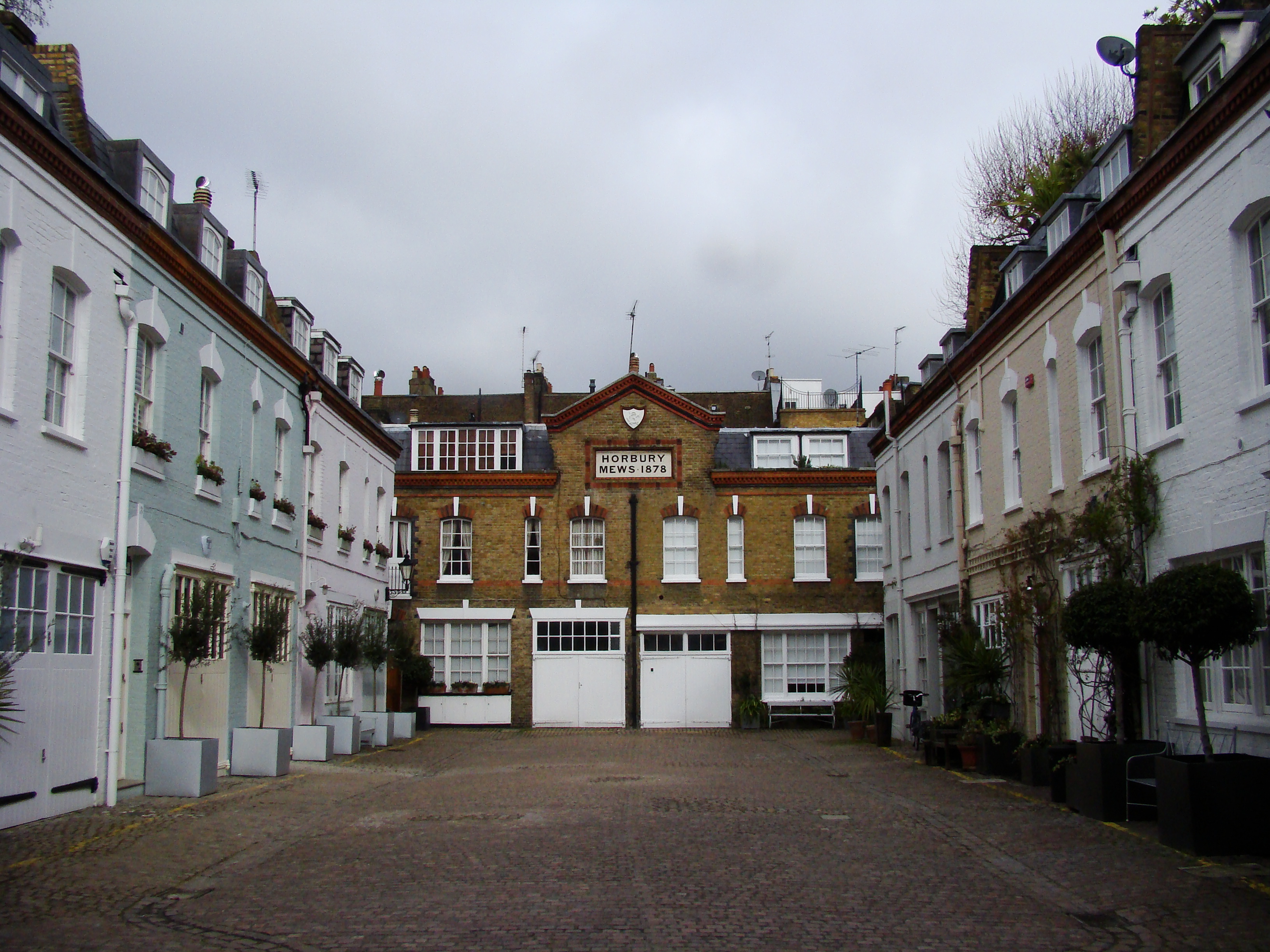
Horbury Mews, located near Ladbroke Road in Notting Hill

Mews was applied to service streets and the stables in them in cities, primarily London. In the 18th and 19th centuries, London housing for wealthy people generally consisted of streets of large terraced houses with stables at the back, which opened onto a small service street. The mews had horse stalls and a carriage house on the ground floor, and stable servants' living accommodation above.

Generally this was mirrored by another row of stables on the opposite side of the service street, backing onto another row of terraced houses facing outward into the next street. Sometimes there were variations such as small courtyards. Most mews are named after one of the principal streets which they back onto. Most but not all have the word "mews" in their name.

Mews are often found in the boroughs of Kensington and Chelsea and Westminster (particularly Mayfair and Marylebone).

=== Europe ===
This arrangement was different from most of continental Europe, where the stables in wealthy urban residences were usually off a front or central courtyard. The advantage of the British system was that it hid the sounds and smells of the stables away from the family when they were not using the horses. Similar to the UK, 45 of the buildings in Kerkstraat in Amsterdam were originally the stables and coach houses of houses in Keizersgracht and Prinsengracht, between which it runs.

=== Stables not known as mews ===
The word mews is not used for large individual non-royal British stable blocks, a feature of country houses. For example, the grand stable block at Chatsworth House is referred to as "the stables," not "the mews."

== Cars ==
Mews lost their equestrian function in the early 20th century when motor cars were introduced. At the same time, after World War I and especially after World War II, the number of people who could afford to live in the type of houses which had a mews attached fell sharply. One place where a mews may still be in equestrian use is Bathurst Mews in Westminster, near Hyde Park, London, where several private horses are kept. Nearby, the mews' stables have been put to commercial use. Some mews were demolished or put to commercial use, but the majority were converted into homes.

Contemporary movements to revitalise and creatively re-use historical and traditional features of urban environments have cast some appreciative light on mews. A presentation of the some 500 former horse stables in the city of London appears in the book The Mews of London: A Guide to the Hidden Byways of London's Past (1982), including individual chapters providing history and walking maps for mews in six districts near Hyde Park: Bayswater, Notting Hill, Kensington, Belgravia, Mayfair, and Marylebone.

A 2015 survey of the mews in London estimated that there were 391 original and surviving mews properties still in existence, 239 of which had been redeveloped. The survey classified an "Authentic Mews" property as "A property in a Mews – a lane, alley, court, narrow passage, cul de sac or back street originally built behind houses in the 17th, 18th and 19th centuries to provide access for stables or coach house accommodation, often with associated living accommodation, – that is now most likely to be a modernised residential dwelling, possibly with commercial premises. An Authentic Mews property will retain the approximate appearance, form and footprint of the original Mews, but it may have been re-developed to a degree and no longer retains all original Mews features."

== In contemporary urban planning and construction ==
The use of mews in new urban development is advocated by Leon Krier, who is himself a strong influence on the New Urbanism movement in the United States. For his foundational contributions to the movement, Krier received the first Athena Medal awarded by the Congress for the New Urbanism in 2006.

In the Smart Growth, Traditional Neighborhood Development and New Urbanism movements, the term is used frequently, but definitions of the term are rare. The East Village Redevelopment Plan for Calgary, Alberta, Canada, explains that "Mews are narrow, intimate streets that balance the access and service functions of a lane with active building frontages, accessory uses, and a street space shared by cars and pedestrians."

== See also ==
- Alley
- Carlton Terrace Mews
- Courtyard housing
- Washington Mews
