= The Horror at Red Hook =

Short story by H. P. Lovecraft

- Short story by H. P. Lovecraft
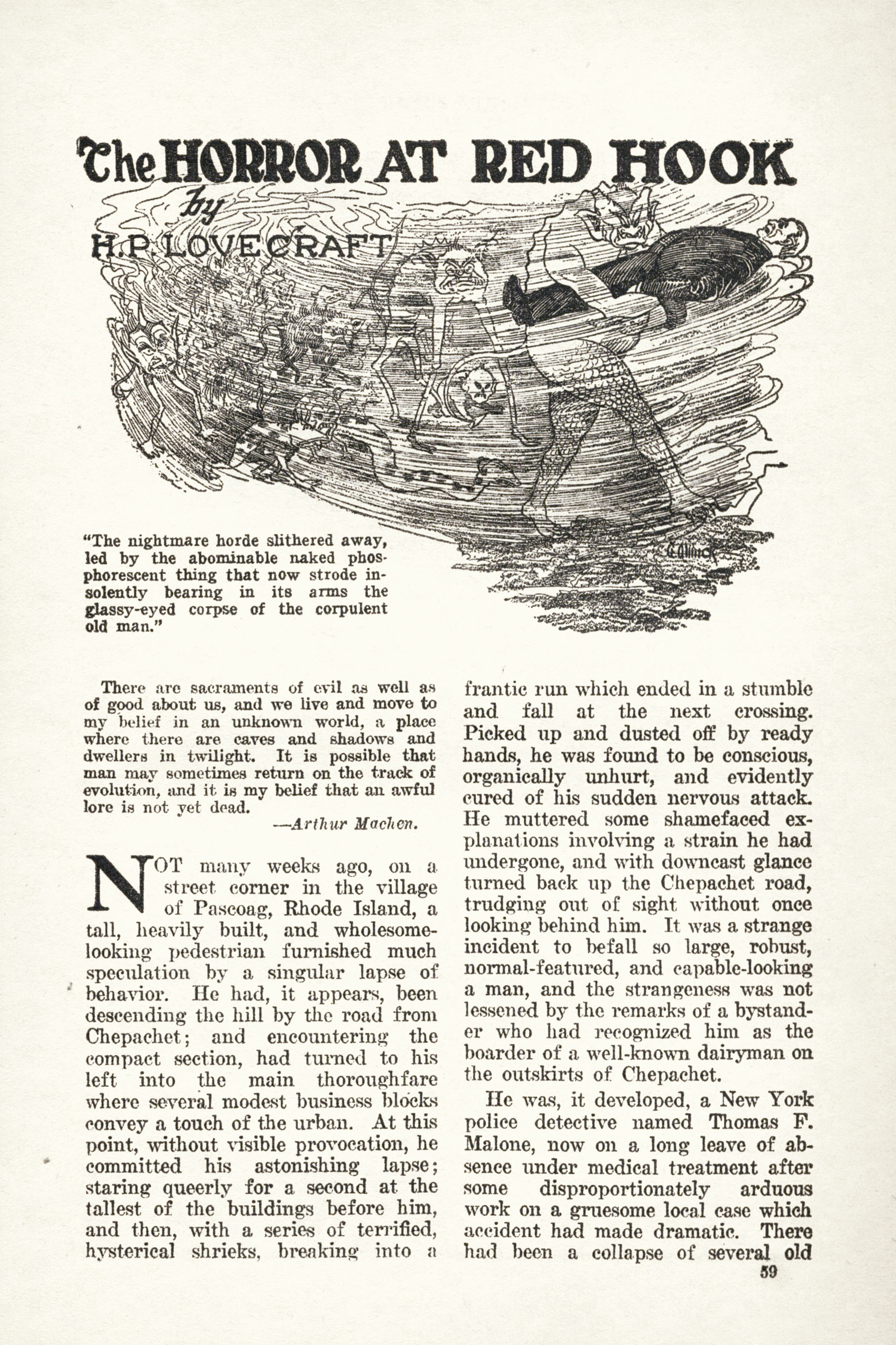
- Title page of "The Horror at Red Hook" as it appeared in Weird Tales, January 1927. Illustration by G. O. Olinick.

Text available at Wikisource
- Country: United States
- Language: English
- Genre: Horror

Publication
- Published in: Weird Tales
- Publication type: Periodical
- Media type: Print (magazine)
- Publication date: January 1927

"The Horror at Red Hook" is a short story by American writer H. P. Lovecraft, written on August 1–2, 1925. "Red Hook" is a transitional tale, situated between the author's earlier work and the later Cthulhu Mythos. Although the story depicts a sinister cult, this cult offers a conventionally occult devil-worshipping threat, rather than the cosmic threat depicted in his later work. Living in poverty in the slum of Red Hook at the time of writing, Lovecraft was at this time urgently attempting to widen his markets in the pulp magazines. By having an unusually proactive Irish New York police detective as his protagonist, he hoped for a swift sale to a detective pulp, which would have opened up a new market other than his usual Weird Tales magazine. He did not get such a sale, and had to fall back on Weird Tales. "Red Hook" was thus first published in the January 1927 issue of Weird Tales.

== Plot summary ==
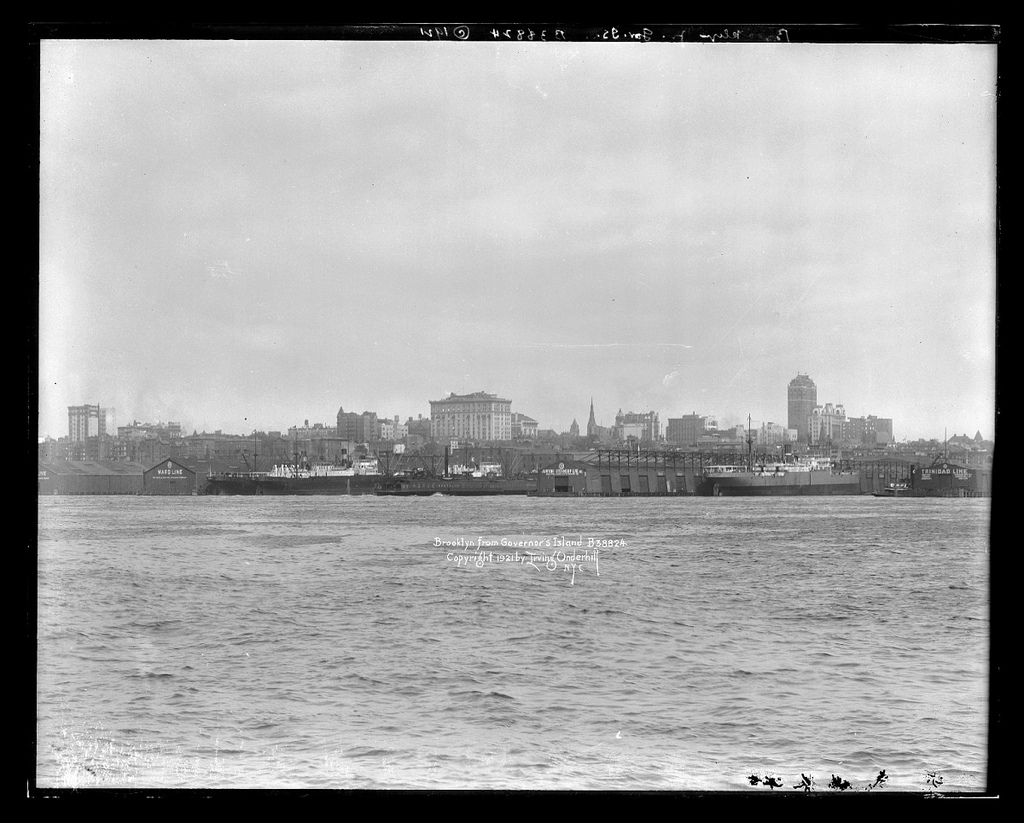
View of Red Hook, 1921.

The story begins with Detective Malone describing an on-duty incident in Red Hook, Brooklyn, that gave him a phobia of large buildings. Back-tracking to where it all began, the Brooklyn waterfront slum Red Hook is described in detail, with its gangs and crime, and hinting at an occult underbelly.

The "case of Robert Suydam" is then told to be the driving force behind Malone's federally ordered involvement at Red Hook. Known as a shabby recluse, Suydam has been seen around town looking younger and more radiant. News arrives of his engagement to a well-to-do woman, while, at the same time, there is an increase in local kidnappings. A police raid, involving Malone, uncovers nothing useful from Suydam's Red Hook flat save a few strange inscriptions.

After Suydam's wedding, he and his bride leave on a ship. Aboard, a scream is heard and, when the crew enter Suydam's stateroom, they find him and his wife dead, with claw-marks on his wife's body. Later, some strange men from another ship come on board and lay claim to Suydam's body.

Malone enters Suydam's flat to see what he can find. In the basement, he comes across a door that breaks open and sucks him inside, revealing a hellish landscape. He witnesses human sacrifices and a ritual that reanimates Suydam's corpse. Malone is found in the basement of Suydam's flat, which has caved in inexplicably above him, killing everyone else inside. The tunnels and chambers uncovered in the raids are filled in and cemented, though, as Malone recounts, the threat in Red Hook subtly re-emerges.

== Characters ==
Thomas Malone
An Irish-born New York police detective, "detailed to the Butler Street station in Brooklyn" before going on indefinite medical leave. A "Dublin University man born in a Georgian villa near Phoenix Park", he is said to have "the Celt's far vision of weird and hidden things, but the logician's quick eye for the outwardly unconvincing... In youth he had felt the hidden beauty and ecstasy of things, and had been a poet; but poverty and sorrow and exile had turned his gaze in darker directions, and he had thrilled at the imputations of evil in the world around." This morbid streak is offset by a "keen logic and a deep sense of humour". He is 42 at the time of "The Horror at Red Hook".
Robert Suydam
A "lettered recluse of ancient Dutch family, possessed originally of barely independent means, and inhabiting the spacious but ill-preserved mansion which his grandfather had built in Flatbush". Seen by most as "a queer, corpulent old fellow whose unkempt white hair, stubbly beard, shiny black clothes, and gold-headed cane earned him an amused glance", Malone knew of him as "a really profound authority on mediaeval superstition". On account of "certain odd changes in his speech and habits; wild references to impending wonders, and unaccountable hauntings of disreputable Brooklyn neighbourhoods", his relatives tried unsuccessfully to have him declared insane. He is about 60 in the time frame of the story.

== Connections to other Cthulhu Mythos tales ==
"The Horror at Red Hook" is not generally considered to be part of the Cthulhu Mythos, lacking many of the elements that characterize it, such as totally alien cults with cosmic purposes, forbidden tomes, unknown gods and a sense of true "outsideness", as the cult and occult magic in the story have decidedly real world origins and purposes. However, one of the gods worshipped by the cult is the Magna Mater, which was also worshipped by the cannibalistic cult within Exham Priory in Lovecraft's "The Rats in the Walls" and has been argued by Mythos scholar Robert M. Price to represent Lovecraft's deity Shub-Niggurath.

Robert Suydam lives in a "lonely house, set back from Martense Street". The Martense Family were the subterranean cannibals in Lovecraft's earlier story "The Lurking Fear", who live in a location from which the river flows south to eventually emerge at Red Hook.

== Inspiration ==
Marc Beherec argues that St. George's Syrian Catholic Church was the inspiration for H.P. Lovecraft's The Horror at Red Hook. The building was constructed by Ryneer Suydam, a man with a name very similar to that of the story's Robert Suydam. Beherec argues that the building's conversion from Suydam's Federalist tenement to a Gothic church by a sect he (erroneously) believed to be Nestorian, which began while he was in New York, inspired Lovecraft. Beherec argues the demographic changes in the neighborhood and the physical changes in the building parallel the metamorphoses in Suydam's character and physical appearance, and both in turn also mirror Edgar Allan Poe's "The Fall of the House of Usher".

Lovecraft referred to the area's immigrant population by referring to Red Hook as "a maze of hybrid squalor". He spelled out his inspiration for "The Horror at Red Hook" in a letter written to fellow writer Clark Ashton Smith:

The idea that black magic exists in secret today, or that hellish antique rites still exist in obscurity, is one that I have used and shall use again. When you see my new tale "The Horror at Red Hook", you will see what use I make of the idea in connexion with the gangs of young loafers & herds of evil-looking foreigners that one sees everywhere in New York.

Lovecraft had moved to New York to marry Sonia Greene a year earlier, in 1924; his initial infatuation with New York soon soured (an experience fictionalized in his short story "He"), in large part due to Lovecraft's xenophobic attitudes. "Whenever we found ourselves in the racially mixed crowds which characterize New York, Howard would become livid with rage," Greene later wrote. "He seemed almost to lose his mind."

In his story Lovecraft very nearly accurately describes the mix of demographics of Red Hook circa 1925, but - since his protagonist is Irish - he changed a reference to the then-Irish population of Red Hook to "Spanish". At that time there was no Spanish population in Red Hook, although there was one later.

Much of the occult chanting in the story was lifted from the articles on "Magic" and "Demonology" in the 9th edition of the Encyclopædia Britannica, written by anthropologist E. B. Tylor. Daniel Harms and John Wisdom Gonce note the spell Lovecraft quotes and describes as a "demon evocation" was actually an incantation allegedly used for treasure hunting.

The use of the Yezidi as a devil-worshipping cult, twice implied to be behind the events of the story, seems to have been inspired by E. Hoffmann Price's "The Stranger from Kurdistan". At that time Lovecraft was not aware of their similar use in an occult adventure novel of 1920 by Robert W. Chambers.

Martense Street is not a fictional locale; it is one block North of Church Avenue. The Flatbush Dutch Reformed Church in which Suydam was married is on the corner of Church and Flatbush Avenues.

== Reception ==
Lovecraft himself, always modest about his work and at that time rather depressed, said of "The Horror at Red Hook" that the tale was "rather long and rambling, and I don't think it is very good". Nevertheless, it was one of the few stories that saw book publication during his lifetime, chosen for the British anthology series Not at Night.

Critics have tended to disparage the story, largely due to its overt racism. Lin Carter called the story "a piece of literary vitriol". Peter Cannon noted that "racism makes a poor premise for a horror story." ST Joshi, in H. P. Lovecraft: A Life, called the story "horrendously bad" for its racist language.

== Legacy ==
- The Ballad of Black Tom is a retelling of "The Horror at Red Hook" from the perspective of a black man in the service of Suydam. The book, by Victor LaValle, attempts to upend the xenophobic themes of "Red Hook".
- Alan Moore's The Courtyard takes place in Red Hook in the modern era. The blatant racism of the protagonist mimics the inherent racism of Lovecraft's original "Red Hook" tale. The second issue of Moore's comic Providence is also based on "The Horror at Red Hook".

== Novels ==
- Robert Suydam features prominently in Lovecraftian: The Shipwright Circle by Steven Philip Jones. The Lovecraftian series reimagines the weird tales of H. P. Lovecraft into one single universal modern epic.
