= 303 (comics) =

2004-5 comic-book mini-series

- Cover to 303 #1 (October 2004). Art by Jacen Burrows.

Publication information
- Publisher: Avatar Press
- Schedule: Monthly
- Format: Limited series
- Genre: War
- Publication date: September 2004 - October 2005
- No. of issues: 6

Creative team
- Written by: Garth Ennis
- Artist: Jacen Burrows
- Colorist: Greg Waller
- Editor: William A. Christensen

Collected editions
- 303: ISBN 1-59291-037-8

303 is a six-issue comic-book mini-series created by Garth Ennis and Jacen Burrows, and published by American company Avatar Press. The story targets a mature audience.

== Plot summary ==
The story spans two parts titled "Afghanistan's Plains" and "Black Arrow" (after a monologue in J.R.R. Tolkien's The Hobbit) each consisting of three issues and centers around a Russian Spetsnaz colonel.

In the first part the colonel leads a Russian team investigating a plane crash in Afghanistan. Violence soon erupts after first British and then American military forces become involved in the investigation. In the aftermath, the colonel helps a wounded British Special Air Service trooper who translates a document found on the plane. The document suggests that there is a high-level conspiracy in the United States; that the global war on terror was started in order to facilitate the west taking over the oil-rich Middle East.

In the second part the colonel travels alone to the United States in order to carry out a self-assigned mission, where he first faces a sheriff troubled by the loss of his wife because of the deficiency of their insurance. The story also focuses on the problems of illegal Mexican immigrants apparently exploited at a slaughterhouse called "McHell". The Colonel eventually assassinates the President of the United States with the intention of stopping the Global War on Terror, using a Lee–Enfield rifle using only iron sights, firing from behind a closed window.

== Name ==
The title of the series refers to a .303 British calibre Lee–Enfield rifle.

== Collected editions ==
The issues have been collected as a trade paperback:

- 303 (by Garth Ennis and Jacen Burrows, Avatar Press, 6-issue mini-series, 2004, tpb, 144 pages, March 2007, ISBN 1-59291-037-8)
