= Chronicles of Wormwood =

Comic book series

- Cover to Chronicles of Wormwood #1. Art by Jacen Burrows.

Publication information
- Publisher: Avatar Press
- Schedule: Monthly
- Format: Limited series
- Publication date: 2006-2007
- No. of issues: 6

Creative team
- Created by: Garth Ennis
- Written by: Garth Ennis
- Artist: Jacen Burrows

Collected editions
- Chronicles of Wormwood: ISBN 1-59291-041-6

Chronicles of Wormwood is a comic book series published by Avatar Press. It consists of two six-issue mini-series and one one-shot, all written by Garth Ennis, drawn primarily by Jacen Burrows and Oscar Jimenez, and colored by Andrew Dalhouse.

== Synopsis ==
Chronicles of Wormwood is the story of Danny Wormwood, a benevolent Antichrist, with his best friend being a reincarnated Jesus Christ, and a talking rabbit (Jimmy). The story follows God (Jesus's father) and Satan's (Danny's father) attempts to convince Danny to begin Armageddon, despite his objections. The series also features an afterlife roadtrip and the Vatican's alliance with the devil. This latter part puts Danny in extreme danger, as the Holy Roman Church knows Danny's weaknesses and is willing to share.

== Main characters ==
Danny Wormwood: The Antichrist and Cable TV executive. He is the son of the Devil and a human woman. Despite his intended role and supposed inherent evil, he is a good, generally well meaning man (if foul mouthed and slightly manipulative). He has decided against starting Armageddon as he believes it is best to just leave humanity to its own devices and decide its own progress. He has the power to permanently change one thing a day.

Jesus: Reborn on Earth to play his part in Armageddon, he becomes Danny's best friend (despite the eternal rivalry of their families from Heaven and Hell). He has refused to do any more of God's bidding and started a peace movement to protest the war in Iraq. He fell victim to police brutality and went into a coma for several years. He came out mildly brain-damaged, though he has recently been seen to making a recovery. He was seen explaining socialism and capitalism to 'Fuck Nose' and why one might seem to work while the other doesn't.

Jimmy: A talking rabbit. One of Danny's few friends. He tends to torment people online, notably Star Wars fans. In the first issue, while explaining his powers, Danny says he doesn't know why he decided to make a talking rabbit.

Pope Jacko: The Pope of the Catholic Church. Jacko is Australian and wishes to use the forthcoming end of the world to his own advantage. He was chosen only because the other candidate was black. Jacko breaks the traditional vow of celibacy by, among many other deviant sexual acts, being done up the arse by a nun (who is actually the Devil in disguise) with a strap-on. In the "Last Enemy" one-shot, he sends Brother One to retrieve Jesus in order to help cure him of AIDS. When this plan fails, he dies, and is supposedly taken to Hell by a demon posing as one of his aides.

Fuck Nose: A bartender at Danny's favorite watering hole, "J. Smith's". He makes fun of Jay's condition, so Danny switches his penis with his nose. At the end of the first series, Danny 'fixes' things, but the end result is the man's head now resembles the tip of his penis. In the sequel to the first series, Danny restores the man to normal. His real name is Cedric.

Frank Hardy and Nick Puglio: The creative duo behind many of Danny's productions, Frank and Nick have conflicting personalities but work well together. Frank is soft-spoken and polite, Nick belligerent and short-tempered. Their credits include "I Screwed the President's Wife".

The Devil: Danny's father and the ruler of Hell. He is trying to convince Danny to start the Apocalypse.

Brother One: Also known as the Killer Eunuch (for rather disgusting reasons), he is an assassin sent by the Vatican to retrieve Jesus in the "Last Enemy" one shot. He wields a pair of holy daggers, able to harm Danny. After accosting Jesus and Jimmy at J. Smith's, he follows the two to Wormwood's office, where he is killed when Danny launches him out of a window.

== Collected editions ==
- Chronicles of Wormwood (with Jacen Burrows, 6-issue mini-series, Avatar, 2006-2007, TPB, 144 pages, October 2007, paperback, ISBN 1-59291-041-6, limited edition hardcover ISBN 1-59291-042-4)
- Chronicles of Wormwood: The Last Enemy (with Rob Steen, one-shot, Avatar, 48 pages, Fall 2007 ISBN 1-59291-043-2)
- Chronicles of Wormwood: The Last Battle (with Oscar Jimenez, 6-issue mini-series, Avatar, 2009-2011, TPB, 216 pages, November 2011, paperback, ISBN 1-59291-103-X)
