= Jacen Burrows =

American comic book artist (born 1972)

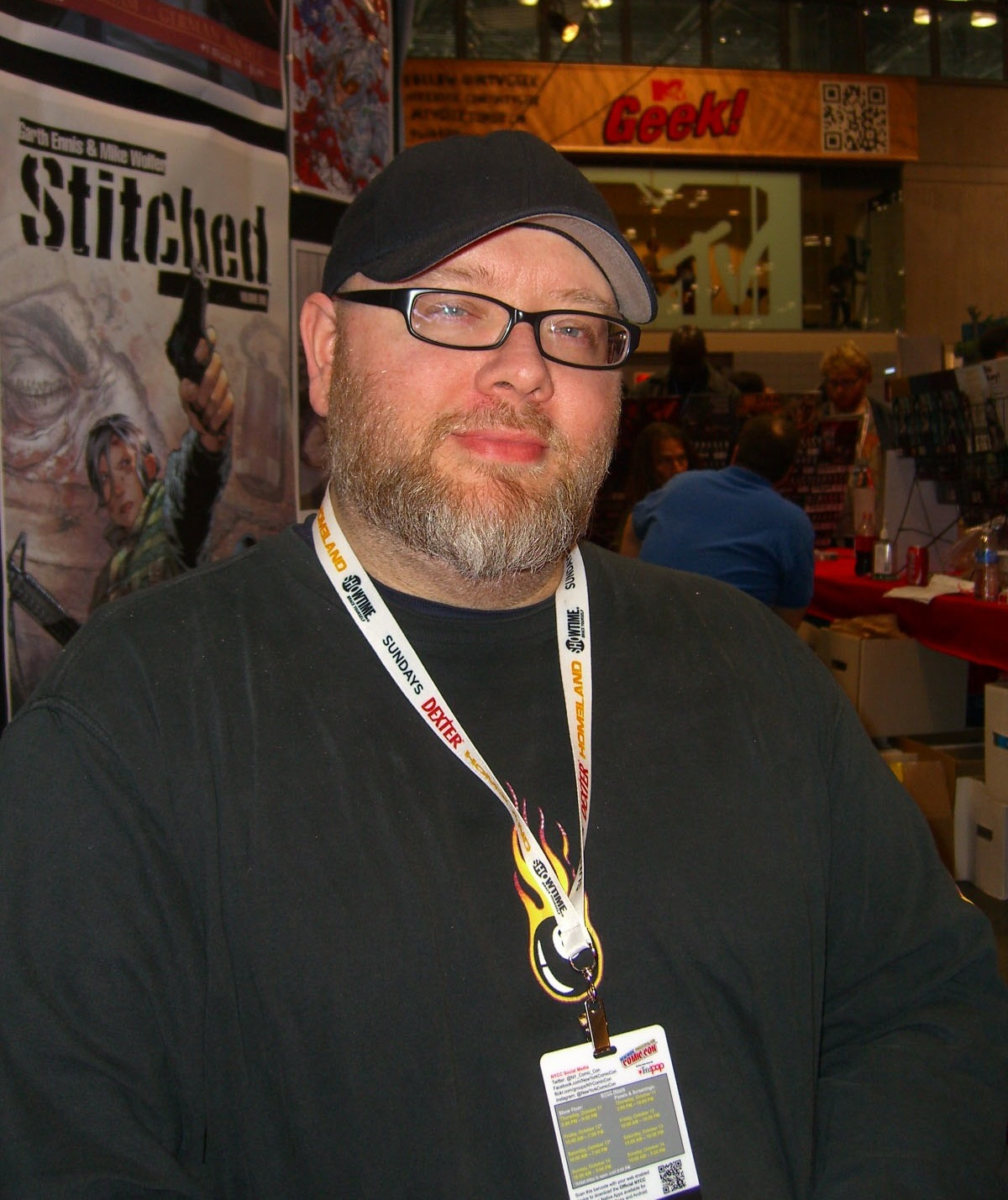
- Burrows at the 2012 New York Comic Con.
- Born: September 11, 1972 (age 54) San Diego, California, U.S.
- Area: Artist
- Notable works: Providence, Neonomicon, Crossed

Jacen Burrows (born September 11, 1972) is an American comic book artist best known for his work on various books from Avatar Press and Marvel Comics.

== Career ==
Burrows graduated from Savannah College of Art and Design in 1996 with a degree in Sequential Art and Illustration.

He started his career providing illustrations for role-playing games such as Dungeons & Dragons and Star Wars.

He broke into comics working as a cover artist for Avatar Press titles such as Snowman: Dead and Dying, Threshold, Quantum Mechanics and Secrets of the Ravening, for which he also did interior work. In 1998 he pencilled the King Zombie series for Caliber Press.

In 2000 he started collaborating with writer Warren Ellis on several titles for Avatar Press including From the Desk of Warren Ellis, Dark Blue, Scars, Bad World and Bad Signal. For Avatar Press he also illustrated several adaptations of Alan Moore's prose, such as Magic Words, Writing for Comics and the Lovecraft homages Yuggoth Cultures and Other Growths and The Courtyard. The latter led to him being noticed by Alan Moore himself. The two of them later expanded the saga which had begun in The Courtyard in the series Neonomicon and Providence.

In 2003 Burrows collaborated with writer Garth Ennis for the first time pencilling the war comic 303. They collaborated again in 2007 on the critically acclaimed Chronicles of Wormwood and the following year on the cult classic Crossed. Burrows went back to the Crossed universe for the anthology series Crossed: Badlands, illustrating two arcs written by Ennis and David Lapham and providing several covers.

In 2017 he started working for Marvel Comics, penciling Max Bemis' run on Moon Knight and reuniting once again with Garth Ennis on the Punisher: Soviet mini-series. He will also illustrate Warhammer 40,000: Marneus Calgar, which will be the first Warhammer comic published by Marvel.

Outside of comics he has done illustration work for several video game companies, including work on Rockstar Games's Grand Theft Auto: Vice City and other computer games.

== Influences ==
Burrows' influences range from 80s indie creators like Matt Wagner, Tim Truman and Mike Baron, to European artists such as Hergé and Moebius, and mangaka like Mitsuteru Yokoyama and Osamu Tezuka. Outside of comics, directors Stanley Kubrick, Alfred Hitchcock and David Lynch informed his work the most.

== Bibliography ==
- Dark Blue (with Warren Ellis, Avatar Press, 2000)
- Bad World #1–3 (with Warren Ellis, Avatar Press, 2001)
- Transmetropolitan: Filth of the City (with Warren Ellis, Vertigo, 2001)
- Ultimate Spider-Man Special #1 (with Brian Michael Bendis, Marvel Comics)
- Scars #1–6 (with Warren Ellis, Avatar Press, 2002–03)
- Alan Moore's Magic Words (written by Alan Moore, adapted by Art Brooks, Avatar Press, 2002)
- Alan Moore's Yuggoth Cultures and Other Growths #2 (with Alan Moore, Avatar Press, 2003)
- Alan Moore's The Courtyard #1–2 (written by Alan Moore, adapted by Antony Johnston, Avatar Press, 2003)
- Alan Moore's The Courtyard Companion (written by Alan Moore, adapted by Antony Johnston, Avatar Press, 2004)
- 303 #1–6 (with Garth Ennis, Avatar Press, 2004-05)
- Chronicles of Wormwood #1–6 (with Garth Ennis, Avatar Press, 2007)
- Crossed #0–9 (with Garth Ennis, Avatar Press, 2008–2010)
- Neonomicon #1–4 (written by Alan Moore, Avatar Press, 2010-2011)
- Crossed: Badlands #0, 1–2, 4, 11 (with Garth Ennis, Avatar Press, 2011–12)
- Providence #1–12 (written by Alan Moore, Avatar Press, 2015-2016)
- Moon Knight #188–193, 197–198, 200 (written by Max Bemis, Marvel, 2017–18)
- Punisher: Soviet #1-6 (written by Garth Ennis, Marvel, 2019–20)
- 2020 Rescue #1–2 (written by Dana Schwartz, Marvel, 2020)
- Warhammer 40,000: Marneus Calgar #1–5 (written by Kieron Gillen, Marvel, 2020)
- The Ribbon Queen #1–8 (written by Garth Ennis, AWA, 2023–24)
- Get Fury #1–5 (written by Garth Ennis, Marvel, 2024)
