= Washington Mews =

Street in Manhattan, New York

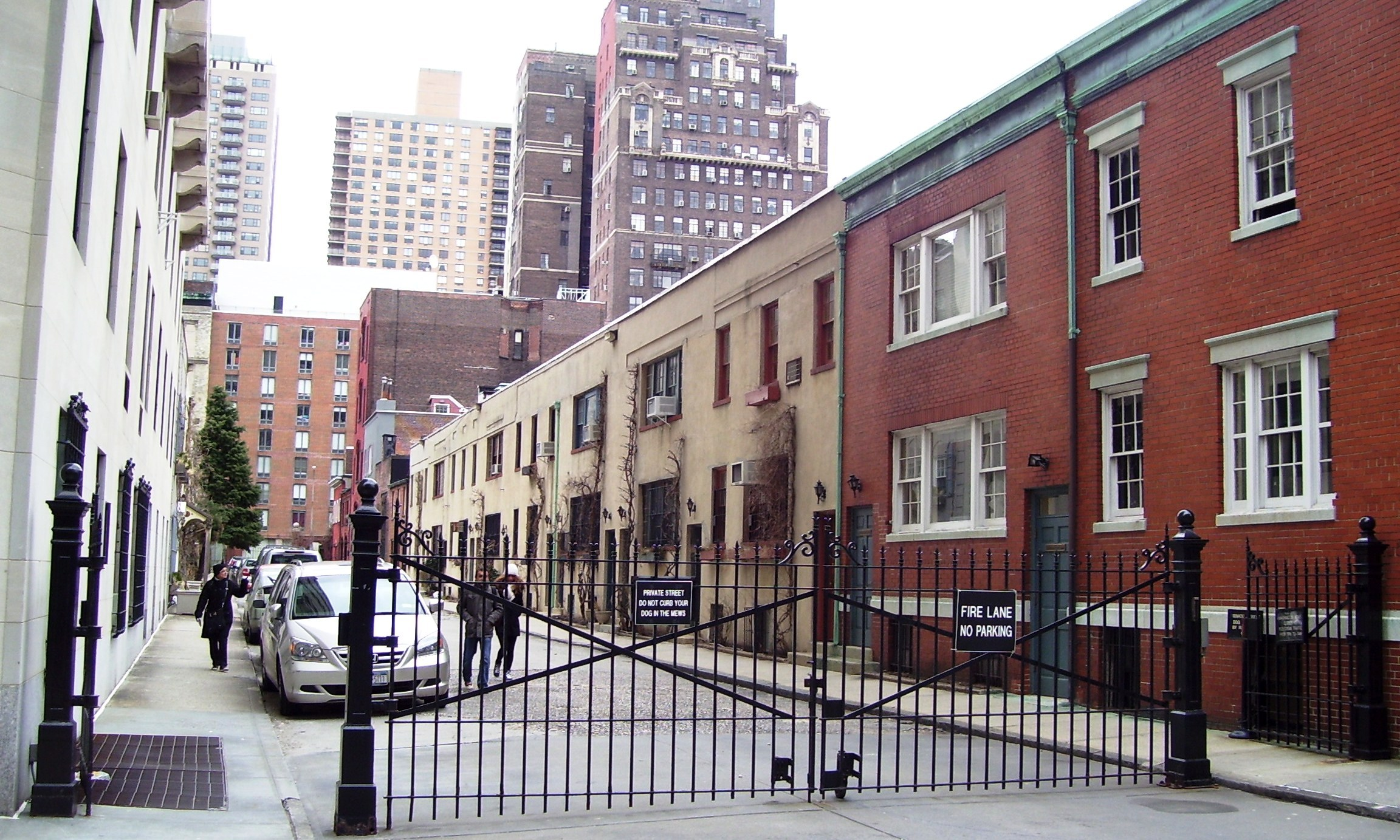
- seen from Fifth Avenue (2011)
- Location: Greenwich Village, New York City
- Coordinates: 40.7313°N 73.9954°W

Washington Mews is a private gated street in Manhattan, New York City between Fifth Avenue and University Place just north of Washington Square Park. Along with MacDougal Alley and Stuyvesant Street, it was originally part of a Lenape trail which connected the Hudson and East Rivers, and was first developed as a mews (row of stables) that serviced horses from homes in the area. Since the 1950s the former stables have served as housing, offices and other facilities for New York University.

== History ==
Washington Mews is on land that in the 18th century was part of a large farm owned by Capt. Robert Richard Randall; upon Randall's death, he bequeathed the land to what became known as Sailors' Snug Harbor. The institution leased the land, using the resulting income to establish its Staten Island complex; the homes built on the land along the north side of Washington Square and the south side of Eighth Street came with two-story stables built along what became known as Washington Mews. The private stables were used by the families of men such as Richard Morris Hunt, John Taylor Johnston, and Pierre Lorillard.

In 1881, New York City's Department of Public Works ordered the construction of Washington Mews first gates at each end, in an apparent attempt to distinguish the Mews from public streets. In 1916, Sailors' Snug Harbor had a dozen of the stables remodeled into artist studios, designed by Maynicke & Franke; during the 20th century, artists living there included Paul Manship, Gaston Lachaise, and later Gertrude Vanderbilt Whitney.

Around 1950, New York University leased most of the entire property and gradually converted the buildings along the Mews into offices and faculty housing. In 1988, NYU hired architect Abraham Bloch to design a new six-foot-high Fifth Avenue gate, replacing the simple posts-and-chain used since the studios were built.

== Gallery ==
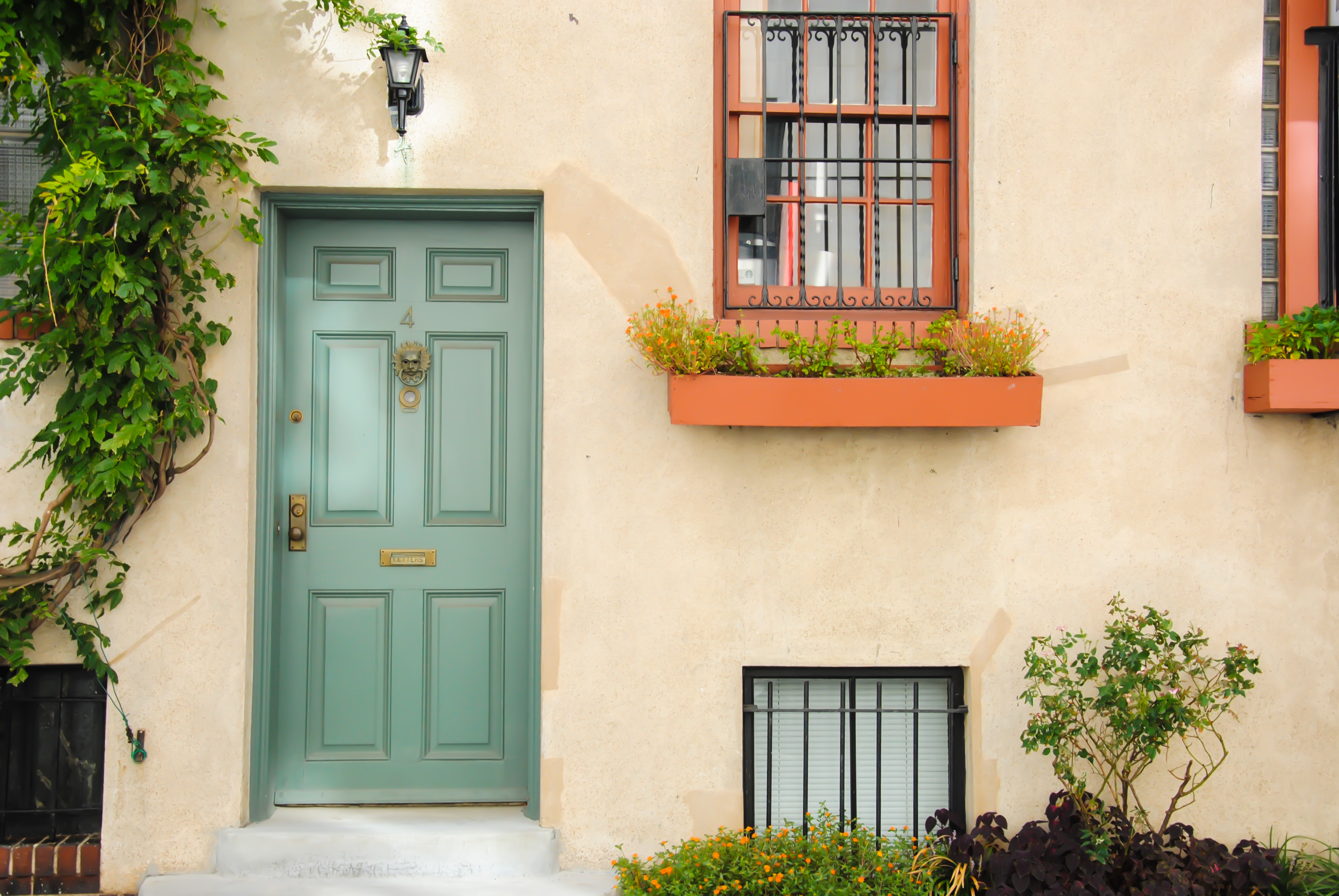
No. 3-10, built in 1939

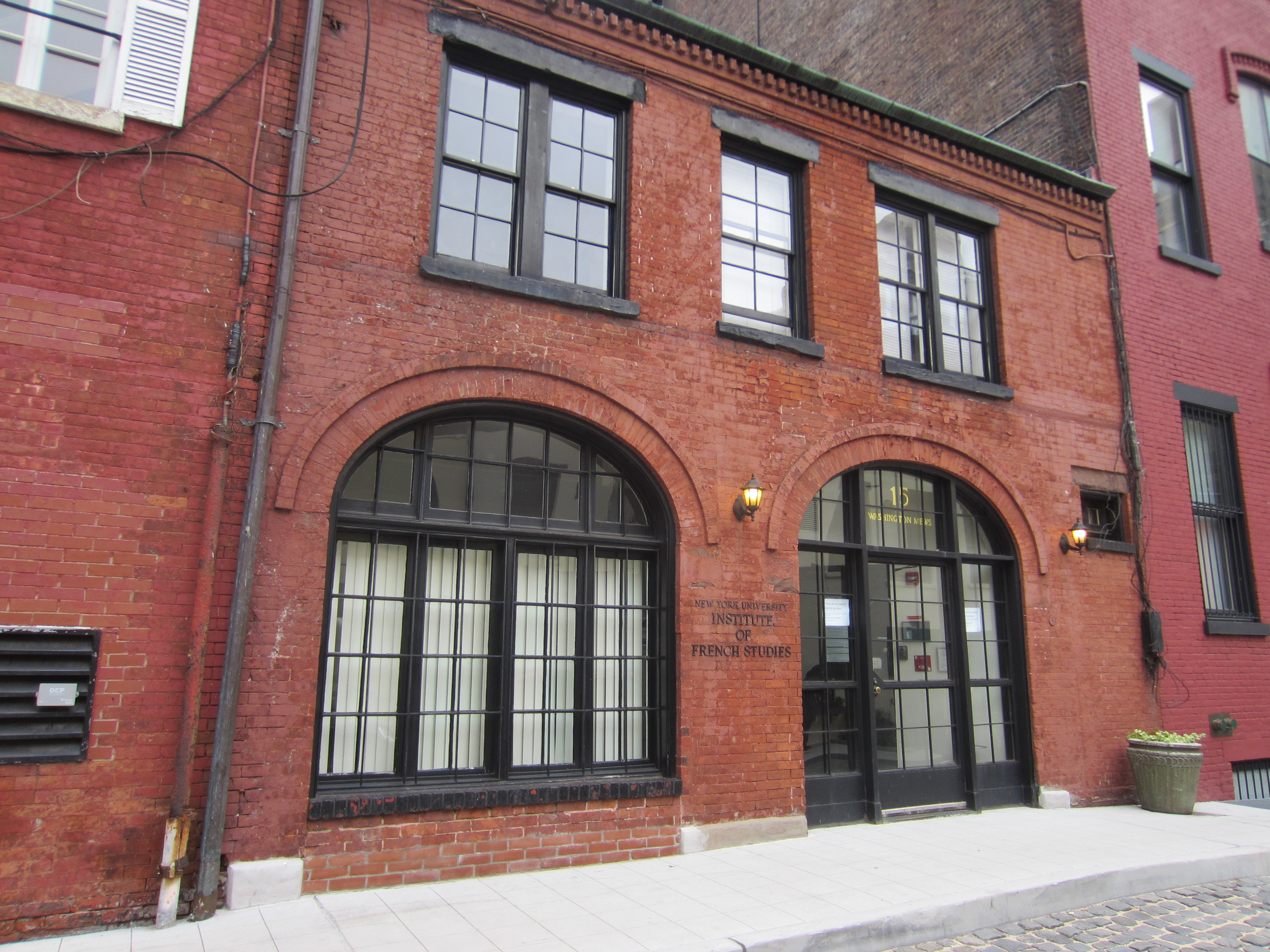
No. 15, built before 1854

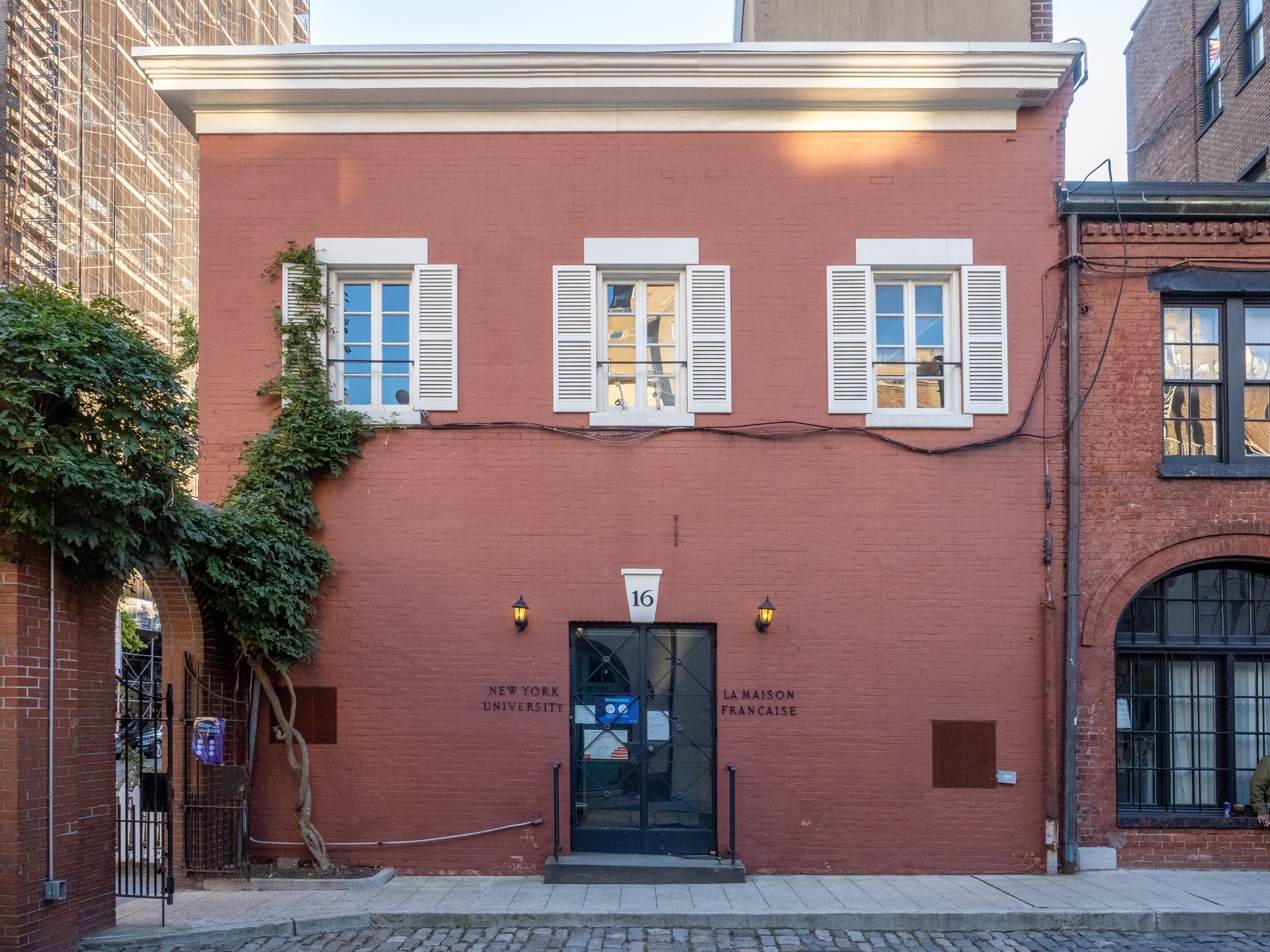
No. 16, built in 1880

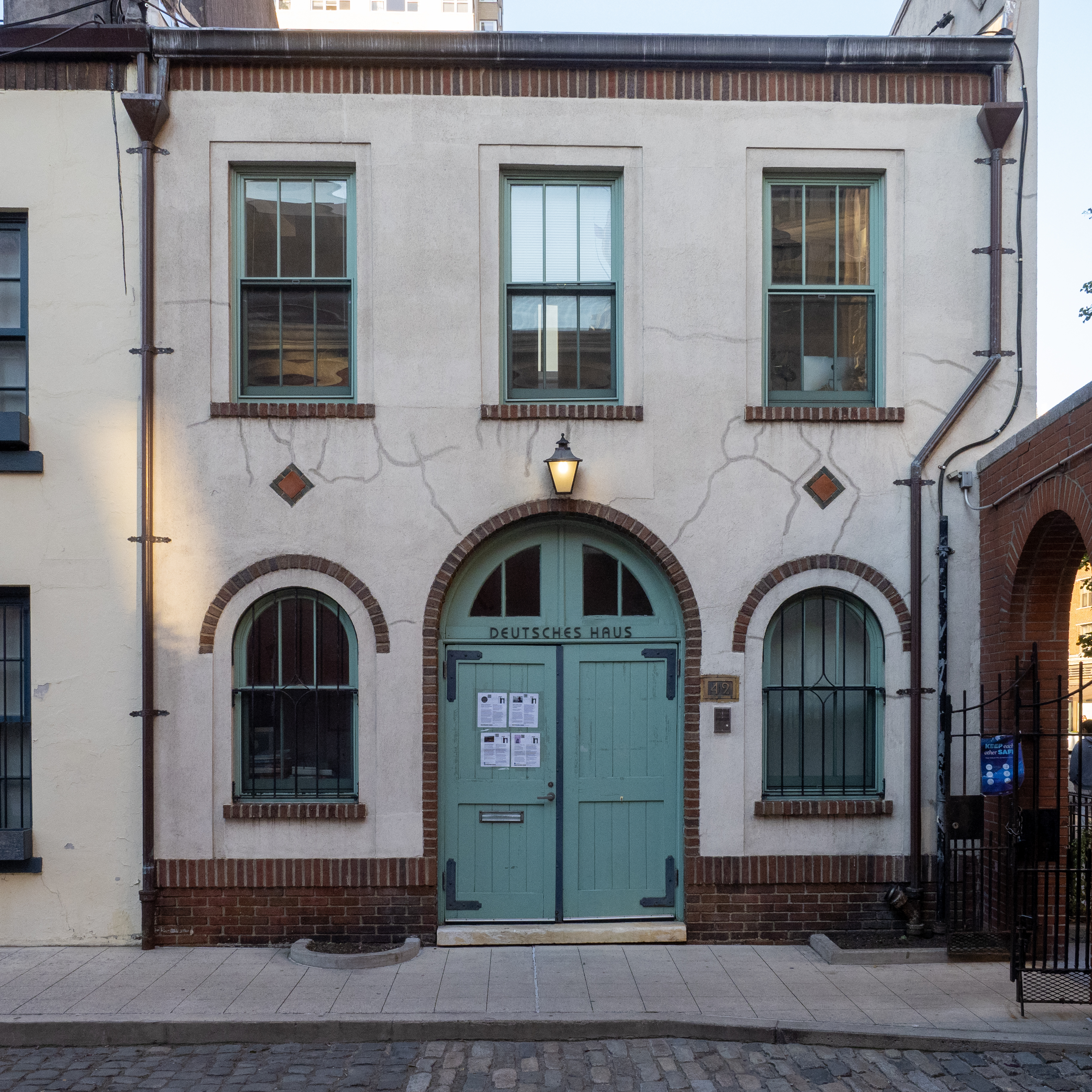
No. 42, built before 1854

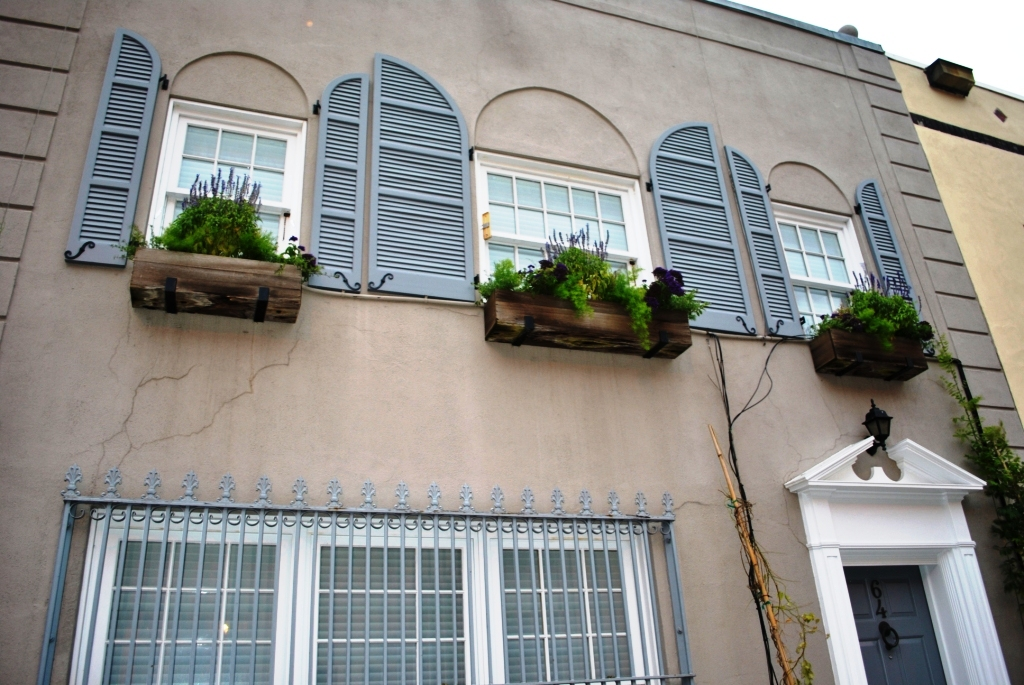
No. 64, built in 1941
