= Oscar Jimenez (comics) =

Spanish comic book artist, penciller and inker (born 1974)

- Born: Oscar Jimenez Garrido; 30 November 1974 (age 51) Badalona
- Areas: Penciller, Inker
- Pseudonym: Juan Barranco
- Notable works: The Flash; JLA; Contest of Champions II; Gravel

Óscar Jiménez is a Spanish comic book artist, penciller and inker.

== Career ==
Jimenez started out in 1993 inking Carlos Pacheco's pencils at Marvel UK and rapidly became well known in the American comic industry for his art on titles such as The Flash, JLA and Contest of Champions II. He commenced work on Avataars: Covenant of the Shield but, according to editor Tom Brevoort, "Oscar Jimenez fell apart halfway through the project, requiring us to bring in other diverse hands to finish [sic] it up."

The artist has recently returned to mainstream American comics work under the pseudonym Juan Barranco, filling in on Squadron Supreme. He is currently doing work on Avatar's Gravel series as well as Chronicles of Wormwood: The Last Battle, a mini-series being written by Garth Ennis.

== Bibliography ==
- Motormouth & Killpower #12 (inks, with writer Matthew Hyde and pencils by Carlos Pacheco, Marvel UK, May 1993)
- Dark Guard (inks, with writer Dan Abnett and pencils by Carlos Pacheco, 4-issue mini-series, Marvel UK, October 1993 - January 1994)
- The Flash #100-102, 106-116 (pencils, with writer Mark Waid, DC Comics, April 1995 - August 1996)
- JLA #8-9 (pencils, with writer Grant Morrison, DC Comics, August–September 1997)
- Stormwatch vol. 2 #1-3 (pencils, with Warren Ellis, Wildstorm, October–December 1997)
- Wolverine: Black Rio (pencils, with writer Joe Casey, graphic novel, Marvel Comics, November 1998)
- Contest of Champions II #1-3,5 (pencils, with writer Chris Claremont, Marvel Comics, September–December 1999)
- Avataars: Covenant of the Shield #1-2 (pencils, with writer Len Kaminski, 3-issue mini-series, Marvel Comics, September–October 2000)
- Squadron Supreme #6 (pencils as Juan Barranco, with writer Joseph Michael Straczynski, Marvel Comics, October 2006)
- Gravel #3-7 (with writer Warren Ellis, Avatar Press, July–December 2008)
- Chronicles of Wormwood: The Last Battle (with Garth Ennis, Avatar Press, July 2009-ongoing)
