= Avataars: Covenant of the Shield =

2000 three-issue comic book mini-series

- Avataars: Covenant of the Shield #1; Cover art by Oscar Jimenez and Eduardo Alpuente

Publication information
- Publisher: Marvel Comics
- Schedule: Monthly
- Format: Limited series
- Genre: Superhero
- Publication date: September–November 2000
- No. of issues: 3
- Main character(s): Champions of the Realm; Dreadlord; Four Fates; Minions of Evil; X-Changelings

Creative team
- Written by: Len Kaminski
- Penciller(s): Oscar Jimenez; Javier Saltares
- Inker(s): Eduardo Alpuente; Chris Ivy; Walden Wong
- Colorist: Joe Rosas

Avataars: Covenant of the Shield is a three-issue comic book mini-series, published by Marvel Comics in 2000. The series is written by Len Kaminski and pencilled by Oscar Jimenez and Javier Saltares.

Set in a sword and sorcery version of the Marvel Universe Earth, it features alternative versions of Marvel characters such as Spider-Man, Captain America, Doctor Doom, the Avengers, the Fantastic Four, and the X-Men.

== Publication history ==
Avataars: Covenant of the Shield was initially intended as a twelve-issue project featuring established Marvel characters in a fantasy setting, but the story was never published. Marvel was in financial trouble at the time, and a twelve-issue series was not considered viable, so the creative team instead produced a three-issue prologue to the main saga, in an unsuccessful attempt to generate sufficient interest in a longer story.

Each issue was priced at $2.99, with Tom Brevoort serving as editor and Bob Harras as editor-in-chief.

== Plot ==
=== Eurth ===
The series begins with the formation of the planet Eurth by the Shaper of Worlds under the supervision of the Living Tribunal, Eternity, and Infinity. Their purpose is to create a planet that is an alternative version of Earth to further understand the heroes that inhabit that world.

=== Covenant of the Shield ===
The overall plot involves the kidnapping of St'vaan Jr., the son of Captain Avalon (the reality's version of Captain America) by forces employed by the Dreadlord (the reality's version of Baron Zemo). Various heroes become involved in the rescue efforts, most of them being members of the Champions of the Realm (the reality's version of the Avengers).

== Characters ==
Most of the characters listed are Eurth's versions of known Marvel Comics characters:

- Champions of the Realm - The protectors of Captain Avalon's realm. They are the reality's version of the Avengers.
  - Captain Avalon - St'vaan is the leader of the Champions of the Realm and the king of Avalon and the reality's version of Captain America.
  - Apollyon - A green-skinned man who is a skilled fighter. He is the reality's version of Drax the Destroyer.
  - Avalonia - A skilled fighter. She is the reality's version of Ms. Marvel.
  - Behemoth - An enormous warrior with super-strength. He is the reality's version of Hank Pym.
  - Blackthorn - An archer and the reality's version of Hawkeye.
  - Bloodraven - A winged warrior that wields daggers in battle. He is the reality's version of Falcon.
  - Bluestone - A skilled fighter, he is the reality's version of Blue Diamond.
  - Ch'll - A warrior with cryokinesis, he is the reality's version of Jack Frost.
  - Faery Queen - A fairy, she is the reality's version of Wasp.
  - Idol/Phantazm - A skilled warrior who was controlled by Dreadlord. Upon his suicide, he becomes an energy being thanks to Witchfire's hexes. Idol is the reality's version of Wonder Man while Phantazm is the reality's version of Vision.
  - Ironheart - A warrior that wore a huge armor that gave him super-strength. He is the reality's version of Iron Man.
  - Merman - A warrior and founding member of the Champions of the Realm that can survive in water, has super-strength, and can fly. He is the reality's version of Namor.
  - Nighthowl - A warrior who has enhanced senses and hunting skills. He is the reality's version of Wolverine.
  - Nosferata - A skilled fighter, she is the reality's version of Black Widow.
  - Skorch - A warrior with pyrokinesis and the reality's version of Human Torch.
  - Swift - A warrior with super-speed and the reality's version of Quicksilver.
  - Warmaker - A warrior who is immortal due to him being part of the Unliving. He is the reality's version of Thor.
  - Witchfire - A witch who can cast magical hexes and the reality's version of Scarlet Witch.
- Duke Ctranj - A wizard who is loyal to Captain Avalon. He is the reality's version of Doctor Strange.
- Four Fates - Legend has it that the Four Fates gained their abilities when St. Nathaniel tapped into the cosmic pulse of life which affected his sons and daughter. They are the reality's version of the Fantastic Four.
  - Lord Nimbus - An aerokinetic member of the Four Fates and the reality's version of Mister Fantastic.
  - Count Crag - A rock monster and member of the Four Fates. He is the reality's version of Thing.
  - Lady Aqua - An aquakinetic member of the Four Fates and the reality's version of Invisible Woman.
  - Prince Morningstar - A pyrokinetic member of the Four Fates, he is the reality's version of Human Torch.
- St. Nathaniel - A brilliant alchemist and technomancer that played a part in the origin of the Four Fates. He is the reality's version of Nathaniel Richards.
- Greenskyn Smashtroll - A troll and former member of the Champions of the Realm. He is the reality's version of Hulk.
- Queen Sharaan - The Queen of Avalon, wife of Captain Avalon, and father of St'vaan Jr., she is the reality's version of Sharon Carter.
- St'vaan Jr. - The son of Captain Avalon and Queen Avalon.
- Webslinger - A man who was turned into a humanoid spider with great responsibility for breaking his vow to the Widow of the Web not to use his abilities for personal gain by saving his uncle. Since then, Webslinger protects Webwood. He is the reality's version of Spider-Man.
- Widow of the Web - A spider-themed sorceress, she is the reality's version of Madame Web.
- X-Changelings - A group of outcasts that were gathered to promote co-existence between humans and the "ex-changed". They are the reality's version of the X-Men.
  - Seer - The leader of the X-Changelings who has a psionic projection ability and the reality's version of Professor X.
  - Brutus - A humanoid beast warrior that wields an axe and the reality's version of Beast.
  - Icemaker - A cryokinetic member of the X-Changelings and the reality's version of Iceman.
  - Psyche - A psychic member of the X-Changelings and the reality's version of Jean Grey.
  - Redeye - A knight who can shoot beams from his eyes. He is the reality's version of Cyclops.
  - Whitehawk - A warrior with wings instead of arms who can fly and the reality's version of Angel.

=== Villains ===
- Doomsmith - A full-armored warrior who watched the Champions of the Realm leave Castle Bakstur. He is the reality's version of Doctor Doom.
- Dreadlord - A hood-wearing warrior who was Z'axis' greatest general and the boss of the Minions of Evil. He is the reality's version of Baron Zemo.
- Goblin King - A goblin residing in Webwood who is the boss of the Six Most Sinister. He is the reality's version of Green Goblin.
- Minions of Evil - A group of villains gathered together by the Dreadlord to fight the Champions of the Realm. They are the reality's version of the Masters of Evil.
  - Black Blade - A swordsman who wields a black blade and rides a demonic winged horse. He is the reality's version of Black Knight.
  - Darkwater - A liquid warrior. Darkwater was accidentally killed by Black Blade during the Minions of Evil's fight with the Champions of the Realm. He is the reality's version of Hydro-Man.
  - Deathlight - An armored warrior that projects black energy. He is a hybrid counterpart of Blackout and Living Laser.
  - Deathmaster - A warrior who is covered in weapons. He is the reality's version of Taskmaster.
  - Green Death - A humanoid-shaped cloud and the reality's counterpart of Radioactive Man.
  - Ill Wind - A warrior who can spin at super-speed in order to produce winds and is the reality's version of Whirlwind.
  - Iron Cross - An armored warrior who is a skilled fighter.
  - Moonchild - A sorceress and the reality's version of Moonstone.
  - Savagri - A warrior who wielded an axe and a shield. Savagri was accidentally killed by Scorpius. She is the reality's version of Titania.
  - Scarabus - A helmeted man in a robe. He is the reality's counterpart of Beetle.
  - Scorpius - A humanoid scorpion. Scorpius was impaled by Merman who accidentally killed Savagri upon his death. He is the reality's version of Scorpion.
  - Scythe - A skeletal creature who wields a giant scythe and the reality's version of Grim Reaper.
  - Skreech - A warrior who can project sonic attacks from the metallic weapon affixed to his right hand. He is the reality's version of Klaw.
  - Slag - A warrior who can generate fire and heat. He is the reality's version of Melter.
  - Swashbuckler - A swordsman and the reality's version of Swordsman.
  - Titan - A warrior and the reality's version of Atlas.
  - Von Bludving - A vampire who wields a bone-like sword and shield. He is the reality's version of Baron Blood.
- Simon Magus' X-Changelings - The opposing band of the X-Changelings that want to supplant the humans. They are the reality's version of the Brotherhood of Mutants.
  - Simon Magus - The leader of his X-Changelings who can generate energy shields and break hexes. He is the reality's version of Magneto.
  - Aura - A swordsman.
  - Hop-Friend - A man with leaping abilities and the reality's version of Toad.
  - Humongous - A man with immovable abilities and the reality's version of Blob.
  - Illusio - An illusionist and the reality's version of Mastermind
- Six Most Sinister - A brigand in Webwood that work for Goblin King into collecting tolls from those who pass their way. They are the reality's version of the Sinister Six.
  - Huntsman - A hunter who wields two daggers and the reality's version of Kraven the Hunter.
  - Jolt - An electrical being and the reality's version of Electro.
  - Mysterium - A gas-emitting warrior and the reality's version of Mysterio.
  - Sandstorm - A sand monster and the reality's version of Sandman.
  - Talon - A humanoid vulture whose feet wield two daggers. He is the reality's version of Vulture.
  - Tentaclus - A humanoid octopus and the reality's version of Doctor Octopus.

== In other media ==
Captain Avalon and Greenskyn Smashtroll appear as playable characters in Lego Marvel Super Heroes 2.
