= Bad World =

2001 comic book limited series

- Cover to Warren Ellis' Bad World TPB, art by Jacen Burrows.

Publication information
- Publisher: Avatar Press
- Format: Mini-series
- Publication date: May - October 2001
- No. of issues: 3

Creative team
- Created by: Warren Ellis; Jacen Burrows
- Written by: Warren Ellis
- Artist: Jacen Burrows

Collected editions
- Bad World: ISBN 0-9706784-8-7

Bad World is a three-issue comic book mini-series published by American company Avatar Press. It is written by Warren Ellis and illustrated by Jacen Burrows. The series consists of three issues and was published from July through October of 2001. The general theme and tone of the series was continued in Bad Signal.

== Overview ==
Unlike most comic books, Bad World is a work of nonfiction and does not contain characters, plots, or a recurring storyline. Instead, the writing in each issue is a series of observations by Ellis on stories which are incredibly bizarre, but true. The series repeatedly deals with subjects such as serial killers, conspiracy theorists, UFO cultists, and religious fanatics, bizarre acts such as cannibalism, necrophilia, and bestiality, and unusual beliefs such as urine therapy, inedia, and Flat Earthers.

Burrows' art provides a background for Ellis' observations. Though drawn in a realistic style, the art often stylizes or parodies the material being discussed; for example, on a page about a woman who claims that she and her children are alien-human hybrids, Burrows draws a woman sitting in a rocking chair and holding two infant Greys.

== Collected editions ==
The three issue mini-series was collected into a trade paperback in 2002 (ISBN 0970678487).
