= Contest of Champions II =

1999 comic book limited series

- Cover of trade paperback for Contest of Champions II (1999). Art by Michael Ryan.

Publication information
- Publisher: Marvel Comics
- Schedule: monthly
- Format: Limited series
- Publication date: Sept. 1999 – Nov. 1999
- No. of issues: 5
- Main character(s): Rogue; Iron Man; Human Torch; Various Marvel super-heroes

Creative team
- Written by: Chris Claremont
- Penciller(s): Oscar Jimenez; Michael Ryan

Contest of Champions II is a five-issue comic book limited series published from September to November 1999 by Marvel Comics. The series was written by Chris Claremont and pencilled by Oscar Jimenez and Michael Ryan. The series is unrelated to the original limited series of the same name – Contest of Champions – published in 1982.

== Plot summary ==
A group of Earth's heroes are invited by an apparently benevolent race to participate in a series of contests against one another in exchange for advanced technology. This, however, is a ruse staged by the Brood. The Brood Queen plans to absorb the powers of the strongest heroes and channel them into Rogue, then possess her and use the heroes as hosts for Brood embryos.

Courtesy of microscopic nanites, all the heroes (with the exception of Iron Man, whose armor protected him from infection) are drugged and become indifferent to everything except the contest, unable to process the anomalies in the situation facing them. Although the losing heroes are allegedly returned to Earth, Iron Man's first victory allows him to confirm that the departing teleporters lack the strength to return the subject to Earth. After Iron Man loses his second match against X-Force, he learns that the heroes are teleported to a different part of the ship to either destroy each other or be hunted by various animals. After encountering Psylocke, he is able to use his resources to reprogram the nanobots and use them to cure the other losing heroes, he and Psylocke forming a strike force to determine their location and gather the other heroes together to oppose the Brood's scheme. The Brood Queen's plan is eventually disrupted by Hawkeye, who was overlooked in the early stages of the contest, and Iron Man, who leads several defeated heroes against the Brood. The Brood are defeated and Rogue is cured by Warbird, who makes the Brood Queen withdraw from Rogue's body by convincing the Queen that she will kill Rogue if she does not.

=== List of conflicts ===
Winner	Loser	Notes
Iron Man	Psylocke	Psylocke attempted to use her powers to create the illusion that she was still 'Lady Mandarin', but Iron Man used his armour's close-range defences to knock her out when she tried to attack him physically.
Wolverine	Hercules	
X-Force	Iron Man	After easily gaining the upper hand against most of X-Force, Iron Man was distracted by the discovery that Siryn had recently sustained damage to her larynx preventing her from using her powers, his concern for Siryn distracting him long enough for Bedlam to get the drop on him.
Human Torch	Spider-Woman	The Torch trapped Spider-Woman in a fire vortex and drained oxygen out of the resulting dome to suffocate her.
Hulk	Mister Fantastic	Hulk inhaled Mister Fantastic into his mouth as he tried to contain the Hulk by wrapping his body around him, keeping him contained and trapped until he ran out of oxygen and fainted.
Human Torch	She-Hulk	The Torch heated the air around them until She-Hulk passed out from heatstroke.
Storm	Human Torch	After a prolonged chase, Storm forced the Torch into unconsciousness with a continuous wind assault, leaving him with no way to win other than using a nova flame assault that could have killed her, which he opted not to do.
Scarlet Witch	Cable	The Witch's hex-spheres combined with Cable's time-travelling nature caused minor temporal rifts that drew in other-worldly heroes Lockdown and Rosetta Stone into the ship, where they helped Iron Man and Psylocke tackle the threat.
New Warriors	Slingers	Objecting to the idea of a straightforward fist-fight on the grounds that it would be boring, the two teams competed in a basketball game that the New Warriors won.
Spider-Man	Beast	
Domino	Power Man	
Daredevil	Firestar	
Phoenix	Justice	
Hawkeye	Wasp	
Iron Fist	Colossus	
Gambit	Quicksilver	
Black Panther	New Warriors	
Black Widow	Wonder Man	
Deadpool	Generation X	
Invisible Woman	Iron Fist	
Thor	Storm	Thor literally took Storm's breath away by kissing her and inhaling her oxygen.
Deadpool	Daredevil	Deadpool's unusual physiology due to his healing factor, combined with his constant talking and a fake baby, distracted Daredevil long enough for Deadpool to get the drop on him.
Black Widow	X-Force	
Thor	Black Widow	A simple strike with Mjolnir ended the fight quickly.
Phoenix	Thing	Fighting on the Blue Area of the Moon, Phoenix forced the Thing out of the perimeter of the combat zone and held him there until he ran out of breath.
Hulk	Deadpool	Hulk literally landed on Deadpool after dropping him through a hole in the ground.
Spider-Man	Domino	Spider-Man outstripped Domino physically despite their similar ability to predict the other's moves.
Captain America	Black Panther	Black Panther's internal resistance to the current conflict gave Captain America the edge he needed.
Gambit	Wolverine	Wolverine was distracted by the appearance of the Brood Queen — now in Rogue's body — long enough for Gambit to land a finishing blow.
Gambit	Hawkeye	Gambit fought Hawkeye and defeated him. Gambit's agility, accuracy and mutant ability to charge cards was more than a match for Hawkeye's archery.

== Collected editions ==
Title	Material collected	Published date	ISBN
Contest of Champions II	Contest of Champions II #1–5	January 2002	978-0785108139
