= Neonomicon =

Comic book series by Alan Moore and Jacen Burrows

Publication information
- Publisher: Avatar Press
- Format: Limited series
- Genre: Horror
- Publication date: July 2010 – February 2011
- No. of issues: 4

Creative team
- Created by: Alan Moore; Jacen Burrows
- Written by: Alan Moore
- Artist: Jacen Burrows
- Colorist: Juanmar
- Editor: William A. Christensen

Collected editions
- Hardcover: ISBN 1-59291-131-5

Neonomicon is a four-issue comic book limited series written by Alan Moore and illustrated by Jacen Burrows, published by American company Avatar Press in 2010. The story is a sequel to Moore's previous story Alan Moore's The Courtyard and continues exploring H. P. Lovecraft's Cthulhu Mythos. Moore later continued the sequence with his comic Providence.

In March 2012 it became the first recipient of the newly created "Graphic Novel" category at the Bram Stoker Awards.

== Plot ==
FBI agents Lamper and Brears visit Aldo Sax at a psychiatric hospital, where he has been detained since committing two murders. They are investigating a copycat killer, and want to question Sax about his motives. Sax speaks seemingly unintelligible gibberish. After studying the previous investigation of Sax, Lamper and Brears decide to track down drug dealer Johnny Carcosa in Red Hook, Brooklyn. Carcosa escapes into a mural in the courtyard of his apartment building. The agents track Carcosa's disturbing sex paraphernalia to a specialty shop in Salem, Massachusetts.

Going undercover as husband and wife, Lamper and Brears attend an orgy hosted by the owners of the shop, members of the Esoteric Order of Dagon, who regularly indulge in sex rituals to attract the sexual attention of a race of fishmen. Lamper and Brears are exposed as agents and Lamper is killed by the cultists. Brears is locked in a room with a fishman, which rapes her continuously for several days. During this ordeal Brears has a vision of Carcosa, who reveals himself as an avatar of Nyarlathotep, one of the Great Old Ones.

The creature tastes a drop of Brears' urine and determines that she is pregnant. It helps her escape through underwater tunnels into the ocean. Brears returns to the city and contacts the FBI, instructing them to raid the specialty shop. They find that the cultists have been killed by the fishman, which is gunned down by the agents. Three months later, Brears visits Sax and is able to understand his gibberish as Aklo, the language of the fishmen, based on R'lyehian the language of Yuggoth from Lovecraft's stories. She tells him that she is pregnant with the child of the fishman. She realizes that the events in Lovecraft's fiction are actually premonitions of a future apocalypse that will be heralded by the birth of her child, Cthulhu.

== Publication history ==
Moore talked about the genesis of the project in an interview with Wired magazine: "It was just at the time when I finally parted company with DC Comics over something dreadful that happened around the Watchmen film [...] I had a tax bill coming up, and I needed some money quickly. So I happened to be talking to William [A. Christensen] from Avatar Press, and he suggested that he could provide some if I was up for doing a four-part series, so I did. So although I took it to pay off the tax bill, I’m always going to make sure I try and make it the best possible story I can."

Moore wanted to elaborate on some of the ideas presented in The Courtyard while at the same time telling a modern story that did not rely upon a 1930s atmosphere. Another idea was to use some of the elements he felt Lovecraft himself and pastiche writers censored or left out of the stories, such as the racism and sexual phobias. Moore explains: "Lovecraft was sexually squeamish; would only talk of 'certain nameless rituals.' Or he'd use some euphemism: 'blasphemous rites.' It was pretty obvious, given that a lot of his stories detailed the inhuman offspring of these 'blasphemous rituals' that sex was probably involved somewhere along the line. But that never used to feature in Lovecraft's stories, except as a kind of suggested undercurrent. So I thought, let's put all of the unpleasant racial stuff back in, let's put sex back in. Let's come up with some genuinely 'nameless rituals': let's give them a name."

=== Collected editions ===
The series was collected into a single volume, available in both hardcover and softcover. Both versions include the coloured edition of The Courtyard.

- Neonomicon (176 pages, hardcover, November 2011, ISBN 1-59291-131-5)
- Neonomicon (176 pages, paperback, November 2011, ISBN 1-59291-130-7)
