= Providence (Avatar Press) =

Comic book limited series

- Providence #1 cover, by Jacen Burrows

Publication information
- Publisher: Avatar Press
- Format: Limited series
- Genre: Horror
- Publication date: May 2015 – April 2017
- No. of issues: 12 (of 12)

Creative team
- Created by: Alan Moore; Jacen Burrows
- Written by: Alan Moore
- Artist: Jacen Burrows
- Letterer: Kurt Hathaway
- Colorist: Juan Rodriguez
- Editor(s): Jim Kuhoric; William A. Christensen

Collected editions
- Act 1 Limited Edition: ISBN 1592912818

Providence is a twelve-issue comic book limited series written by Alan Moore and illustrated by Jacen Burrows, published by American company Avatar Press from 2015 to 2017. The story is both a prequel and sequel to Moore's previous stories Neonomicon and The Courtyard, and continues exploring H. P. Lovecraft's Cthulhu Mythos.

== Synopsis ==
The series is set in 1919 and centres on Robert Black, a homosexual Jewish writer, initially working in New York as a reporter for the New York Herald. Black takes a leave of absence from his journalism career, with the intention of writing a Great American Novel using "the “Outsiders”, perhaps “occult Outsiders”—whom he is on the trail of across New England—as a metaphor for social outsiders".

== Plot ==
=== I: The Yellow Sign ===
Robert Black, a reporter for the New York Herald and aspiring novelist, is sent by his editor, Mr. Posey, to "scare up" a story about an infamous book called Sous Le Monde, which is rumoured to drive its readers insane. Robert visits one Doctor Alvarez, who once wrote an essay on the subject. Arriving at Alvarez's tenement, the door is answered by his landlady and lover, Mrs. Ortega, who shows him upstairs. In Alvarez's heavily air-conditioned apartment, Robert learns that the book mentions "an early Arab alchemical text" known as Kitab Al-Hikmah Al-Najmiyya ("The Book of Starry Wisdom"), which describes methods of prolonging life. He also learns that Alvarez was provided with a transcript by a man called Suydam. Feeling inspired and intrigued by this story, Robert returns to his office, where he learns that his jilted lover, Jonathan/Lily, has committed suicide in one of New York's Lethal Chambers.

=== II: The Hook ===
Inspired to write his novel, Robert goes on sabbatical from the Herald and heads to Flatbush in search of Suydam. Mr. Posey puts him in touch with Detective Tom Malone, who shows him the church where Suydam lectures on occult philosophy. As they stake out the churchyard where Suydam often walks, Malone makes it clear that he's attracted to Robert. Suydam appears, cutting their conversation short, and Robert introduces himself as an occult scholar. Suydam invites Robert to his home to sell him some of his pamphlets and tells him more about the Kitab, a copy of which is held by his suppliers in Salem, Massachusetts. When Suydam is called away, Robert sneaks into his basement and finds a vast sea cave containing a golden totem and human remains. He is attacked by a glowing female monster and flees, only to lose consciousness. Robert wakes up to find Suydam standing over him. He goes on his way, determined to investigate further.

=== III: A Lurking Fear ===
Upon arriving in Salem, Robert checks in at the Hillman Hotel to locate Tobit Boggs, the man mentioned by Suydam. He walks to the Boggs Refinery and meets Boggs, who tells him about the occult group Stella Sapiente and that he obtained his transcript of the Kitab from one Garland Wheatley. He shows him a "rum run" tunnel leading to a chamber connected to the sea where Boggs' grandfather brought in fish people to Salem. That night at his hotel, Robert has a terrible nightmare involving his dead lover Jonathan/Lily, Tom Malone, swastikas, gas chambers and fish people. He checks out the next day and leaves town by bus, noting that the other passengers all look like fish-human hybrids.

=== IV: White Apes ===
Robert gets his hair cut in Athol, and learns from his barber about Garland Wheatley, a local "medicine man". He walks to the Wheatleys' farm and meets Wheatley himself, who informs him that he parted ways with the Stella Sapiente sect, but that there is a copy of the Kitab in the library at Saint Anselm College. He introduces Robert to his albino daughter, Leticia, and semi-human grandson, Willard. Willard takes an instant dislike to Robert, having perceived that Robert is "aht uv a diff'run' story awlduhgethuh". He leaves Robert in his shed and, unbeknownst to Robert, intends to feed him to his invisible monster brother. Aware of Robert's danger, Wheatley sees him off the property and warns him not to cut across the fields on his way back to town.

=== V: In The Walls ===
Robert gets a ride with a Mr. Jenkins to Manchester, New Hampshire, where he intends to visit Saint Anselm College to read its copy of the Kitab. He's shown around the college by Father Walter Race, who tells him there are government agents in the area investigating a fallen meteorite. He also meets an assistant from the medical department, Hector North, who invites him to stay with him and his 'friend', James Montague, if he fails to find lodgings in Goffs Falls. On the way to find lodgings, Robert meets a precociously intelligent 13-year-old named Elspeth, who suggests he try Mrs. Macey's boarding house. Robert rents a room there, then visits Agent Frank Stubbs and his men, who are investigating where the meteorite came down. Going to bed that night, Robert experiences terrifying nightmares involving Mrs. Macey and a rat-like version of Mr. Jenkins. He packs his bags and goes to Hector North's house, unaware of his new danger.

=== VI: Out Of Time ===
Robert wakes from bad dreams, and James cooks breakfast for him and Hector. James and Hector argue over Hector's desire to kill Robert and reanimate him, but Robert mistakes their bickering for James being sexually jealous. Elspeth delivers a message from the college to their front door, which alarms James and Hector enough that they pack and leave town immediately. Elspeth walks Robert back to the college and suggests they meet again later. Father Race takes Robert to meet Dr. Henry Wantage, who guides him to the library and shows him a photograph of the members of Stella Sapiente, which includes the late Edgar Wade, Elspeth's father. Robert reads the Kitab, and his perception of time becomes distorted. He parts company with Wantage and finds Elspeth waiting for him. She takes him back to her lodgings, where the Being that possesses Elspeth swaps bodies with Robert and rapes him in Elspeth's body. Afterward, the Being swaps bodies back again and "Elspeth" sends a traumatized Robert on his way. Running through the rain, a car passes Robert in which he can see Mr. Jenkins driving him into Manchester for the first time.

=== VII: The Picture ===
Robert finds himself in the middle of a riot during the Boston Police Strike. An off-duty policeman, Eamon O'Brien, shows him to the home of artist and photographer, Ronald Underwood Pitman, who took the photograph of the members of Stella Sapiente at Saint Anselm College. O'Brien stays for a drink and Pitman puts up Robert for the night. The next day, Pitman reveals some of the identities of the people in the photograph to Robert. Robert catches a glimpse of one of Pitman's horrific paintings of ghouls attacking commuters on a subway, and Pitman offers to show him his "technique" in the hope it will make Robert better understand his perilous situation. He takes him down to his basement and introduces him to a ghoul called King George. Afterward, Robert convinces himself that Pitman has merely demonstrated the same form of hypnotic suggestion which he believes Elspeth must have used on him. Pitman realizes he's failed to make Robert understand the truth and suggests he visit local author Randall Carver, whom he hopes might do a better job. Robert bids him farewell and heads on his way. Pitman goes into his dark room and develops a photograph of three ghouls posing with the dead body of O'Brien.

=== VIII: The Key ===
Robert has spent several weeks staying with Randall Carver discussing the relationship between dreams and art. He has also discovered, in an amateur publication called Pine Cones, a writer of weird fiction he particularly admires named H. P. Lovecraft. Carver demonstrates to Robert the power of dreams by taking him into the Dreamlands, where they meet a group of cats who carry them up towards the Moon before they are snatched and dropped by a flock of Nightgaunts. On waking, Carver takes Robert to attend a literary event with Lord Dunsany as its guest speaker. To Robert's delight, one of the other attendees is none other than Lovecraft himself. The unwitting Robert introduces himself to Lovecraft, and it becomes ominously apparent that their meeting has been pre-ordained by dark forces.

=== IX: Outsiders ===
Robert arrives in Providence to meet Henry Annesley, a scientist who has developed a pair of spectacles through which he can see extra-dimensional organisms which overlap our plane of reality. Annesley, a member of Stella Sapiente, tells Robert some of the group's history, and introduces him to Howard Charles, a young genealogist. Annesley observes that Robert and Howard Charles are attracted to each other, and suggests Howard show Robert some of the local landmarks associated with the "Stell Saps". Howard takes Robert to St. John's Church, where occult meetings were once held in the steeple. They go inside and discover a shining trapezohedron in a box, in fact the very same meteorite that fell to Earth in Manchester. Howard seduces Robert, and they have sex while looking into the alien stone. Afterwards, Robert calls on Lovecraft at his home. Lovecraft helps Robert find lodgings, and then Robert accompanies him to visit his mother in the mental hospital. Robert waits while Lovecraft sees his mother and pretends not to overhear their exchange. Lovecraft rejoins him and they depart. Lovecraft's mother looks on after them and sees the same weird creatures in the air that Annesley does through his spectacles.

=== X: The Haunted Palace ===
Robert and Lovecraft discuss how Lord Dunsany and Edgar Allan Poe influenced Lovecraft's early work, and Lovecraft admits that reading about Robert's strange experiences in his commonplace book has inspired him further. Robert's liking for Lovecraft evaporates when he expresses both his homophobia and antisemitism, and soon realizes that the unwitting Lovecraft's father, Winfield Scott Lovecraft, and maternal grandfather, Whipple Van Buren Phillips, were both members of Stella Sapiente. Believing that Lovecraft has been ordained by the occult group to be their 'Redeemer', Robert panics and returns to his lodgings. He writes a letter to Tom Malone, in which he warns him about everything he has discovered on his travels, unaware that the steeple window of St. John's Church appears to be getting nearer and nearer his own. Suddenly, Johnny Carcosa (an avatar of Nyarlathotep) appears in the room and confirms that Robert has helped to fulfill a prophecy in which Lovecraft's stories will bring about the apocalypse. In gratitude, Carcosa kneels before Robert and fellates him.

=== XI: The Unnameable ===
Robert takes the train back to New York and mails the letter to Malone before going to commit suicide in the same Lethal Chamber as his former lover, Jonathan/Lily. Lovecraft's career gains momentum and all his stories merge with reality: Malone goes mad after the events of The Horror at Red Hook; Lovecraft marries; the events of The Dunwich Horror, The Case of Charles Dexter Ward, The Thing on the Doorstep and The Shadow Over Innsmouth play out; Lovecraft makes the acquaintance of August Derleth; Robert E. Howard shoots himself; Lovecraft dies and Derleth becomes his executor rather than Robert Barlow; in the 1970s, hippies discover Lovecraft's work; the Kitab is marketed as the "real" Necronomicon; belief in the occult power of the Necronomicon spreads; Cthulhu plushies go on sale. Then the events of The Courtyard and Neonomicon come to pass... and then the Cthulian apocalypse begins.

=== XII: The Book ===
At the FBI, Carl Perlman concludes that all Lovecraft's fiction, its criticism and Robert's testament have acted as the conduit through which an outside force has taken purchase on humanity's collective unconscious to a point where it can change reality. Word has reached the FBI that a pregnant-looking Merril Brears has sprung Aldo Sax from his asylum, and Perlman wonders if they might find them at Saint Anselm College. He drives to Manchester but instead finds himself in 'Lovecraft Country'. At Miskatonic University, he learns that Brears and Sax have been and gone, and taken the Kitab with them. Continuing on foot to Arkham, he finds a delegation waiting which includes Brears, Sax, some Mi-Go, a woman 'housing' a member of the Great Race of Yith and Lovecraftian scholar S. T. Joshi. In the sky above them floats Azathoth. Carcosa appears, and Brears goes into labour, giving birth to the infant Cthulhu. Carcosa sets the babe into the river as Brears, Perlman and Joshi look on from the bridge. Perlman wonders if there's anything in Robert's commonplace book that might help them reverse the situation, but Brears and Joshi are skeptical. As Shub-Niggurath glides slowly towards the place where they're standing, Perlman rips the book in half and scatters its pages into the water.

== Production ==
=== Background ===
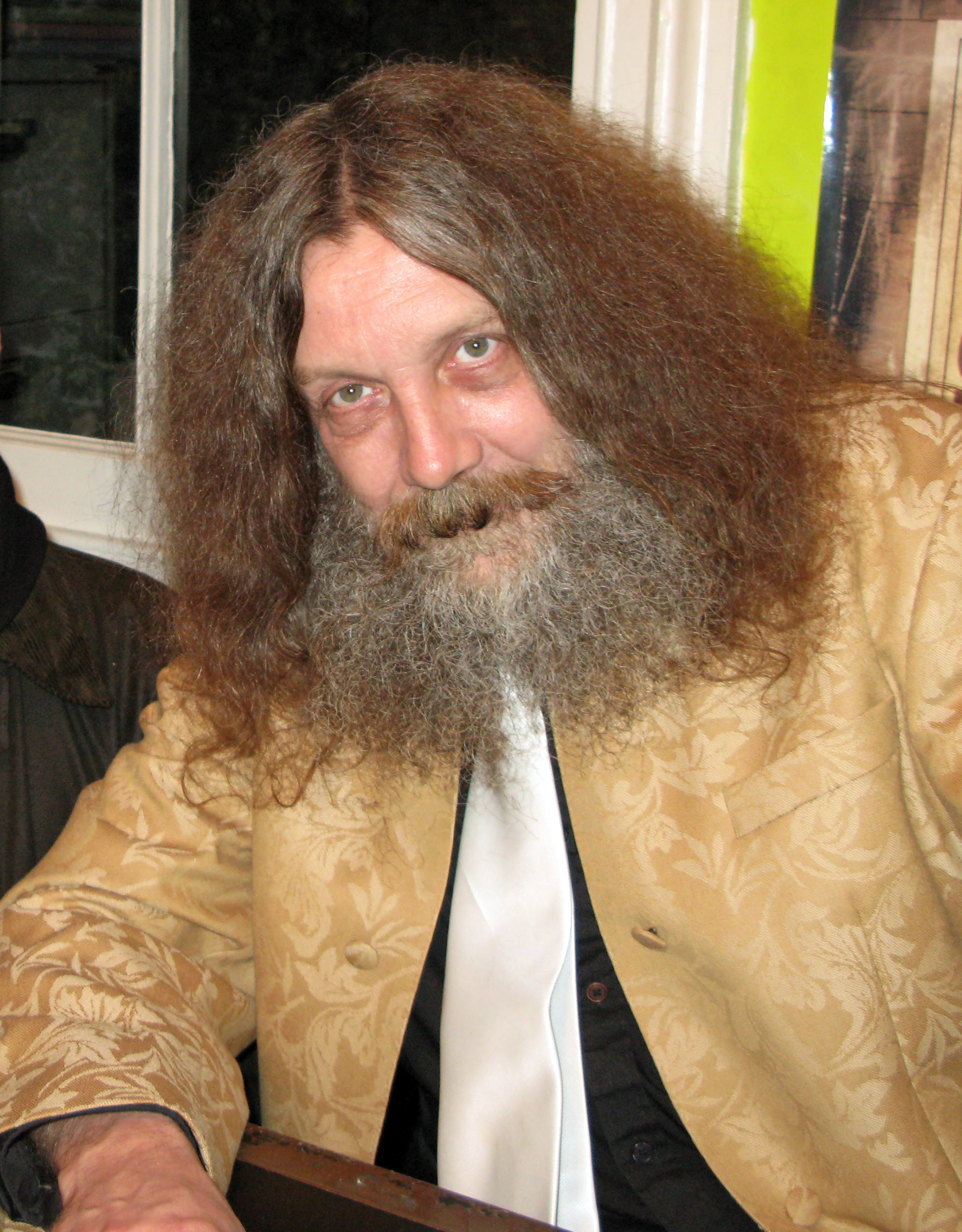
Alan Moore (2008)

Alan Moore is widely regarded as the most influential writer in American comics from the 1980s to the 2000s, known for deconstructing established genres to present new perspectives. His disillusionment with major comic book publishers during the period led him to work for Avatar Press, a niche publisher specializing in bad girl and splatter horror comics, writing several series based on works of H. P. Lovecraft.

Moore has had an interest in Lovecraftian mythos since childhood, occasionally paying tribute in his works including Swamp Thing (1985) and more recent League of Extraordinary Gentlemen (1999-2019). In the 1990s, Moore conceived of Yuggoth Cultures, a series of prose pieces based on Lovecraft's poem cycle, Fungi from Yuggoth. The series was never completed due to accidental loss of the manuscript, but a remaining part was published as "The Courtyard" (1994). This short story featured a contemporary setting to avoid falling into a pseudo-classical imitation, and critically addressed the racism and misogyny of Lovecraft. Comfortable with this approach, Moore further explored these themes after The Courtyard was adapted as a comic by Avatar in 2003. Its sequel Neonomicon was published in 2010 as a four-issue miniseries, in which the cosmic entity Cthulhu, prophesied by Lovecraft through his stories, would be born on modern-day Earth through the rape and pregnancy of the main female character. Moore later realized that the mystery of why Lovecraft, a materialist, had visions of a supernatural world remained unexplained. In Providence, the final installment of Moore's Cthulhu cycle, he went back in time to explore Lovecraft's human nature and creative process.

=== Lovecraft Scholarship ===
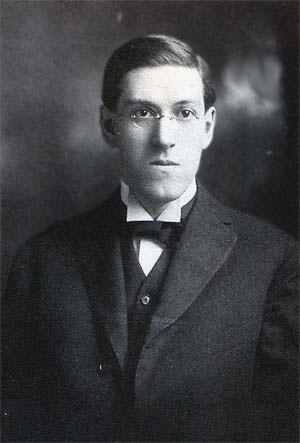
H. P. Lovecraft (1915)

Lovecraft has significantly impacted later generations as the founder of the "Cthulhu Mythos," despite initially being marginalized by mainstream literary circles. Over time, his work has been reevaluated, and by the 2000s, he became a popular subject of cultural studies. Moore spent several years reading as many research books on Lovecraft as he could find before writing Providence. For Moore, a self-taught high school dropout, this was his first experience recognizing the value of literary research. Notable sources of inspiration for him included Graham Harman's Weird Realism: Lovecraft and Philosophy (2012), which applies the philosophy of speculative realism to Lovecraft, and S. T. Joshi's critical biography Lovecraft and the Decline of the West (1990). Conversely, Michel Houellebecq's biography H. P. Lovecraft: Against the World, Against Life (1991) did not align with Moore's perspective. While Houellebecq emphasized Lovecraft's misanthropy and pessimism, Moore viewed Lovecraft as a warm man who loved his hometown and friends, only exaggerating his own neuroses.

Moore believed that contemporary Lovecraftian fiction was based on an outdated view of the subject, and he set out to create "ultimate Lovecraft story" based on the latest literary insights. He is also critical of the Mythos incorporated in mainstream popular culture as parodies and merchandise, and insisted that it is necessary to "refocus the readership’s attention upon the things that are genuinely frightening or disturbing about Lovecraft’s writing." According to him, Lovecraft's works were about how scientific progress had made the world too complex for the traditional worldview to grasp, and about the urge to escape from that complexity, as symbolized by the opening sentence of The Call of Cthulhu. He believed this theme was prescient enough to remain relevant even today.

Psychiatrist and literary critic Dirk W. Mosig theorized that all of Lovecraft's works constituted one large "hypernovel". Moore embraced this idea and developed connections between characters and events in each story, many of which were set in overlapping time periods and regions. Unlike Lovecraft's many followers who attempted to systemize the Mythos, Moore aimed to place the original works within the context of biographical fact and the unstable post-World War I American society. The story of Providence was set in 1919, just before the completion of Lovecraft's persona popularized among later generations, and prior to the creation of Cthulhu and his friendships with people like Robert E. Howard and Clark Ashton Smith. This era was also significant in U.S. political history, as it was on the eve of the women's suffrage movement and Prohibition, among others. With this period setting, Moore sought to depict "the birth of modern America, and the birth of modern American terror."

=== Social minorities ===
Moore stated that Lovecraft's uniqueness lay in his embodiment of the collective fears that American society had had at the time.

Far from outlandish eccentricities, the fears that generated Lovecraft’s stories and opinions were precisely those of the white, middle-class, heterosexual, Protestant-descended males who were most threatened by the shifting power relationships and values of the modern world.

— Alan Moore, 2014

Lovecraft preferred to think of himself as a social outsider, but in reality, he belonged to the WASP heterosexual male majority and was prejudiced against other groups. According to Moore, Lovecraft was "an entrenched social insider unnerved by new and alien influences from without." Moore believed that Lovecraft's fears were deeply linked to contemporary modes of thought and could be key to understanding the dilemmas of modern society.

Lovecraft's racism has been well known among enthusiasts and researchers, resulting in growing criticism which led to the design of the World Fantasy Award trophy being changed from a bust of him in 2016. However, when Lovecraft himself is featured in pop culture (especially in comics), his bigotry is often ignored or, conversely, caricatured and exaggerated without depiction of the historical context. Lovecraft lived in the United States during a time when xenophobia was on the rise due to growing immigration, scientific racism was prevalent, and discrimination against people of color and homosexuals was legal. Moore incorporated these elements into his work.

To give a different perspective to Lovecraft's "outsider" self-image, the protagonist, Robert Black, was set as a gay male Jew. Black hides his identity to avoid social prejudice and shows little sympathy for other minorities. Moore has stated that while Black might be seen as "cowardly and unethical" and therefore less sympathetic by today's readers, he prioritized realistic characterization that reflected the time.

=== Artwork ===
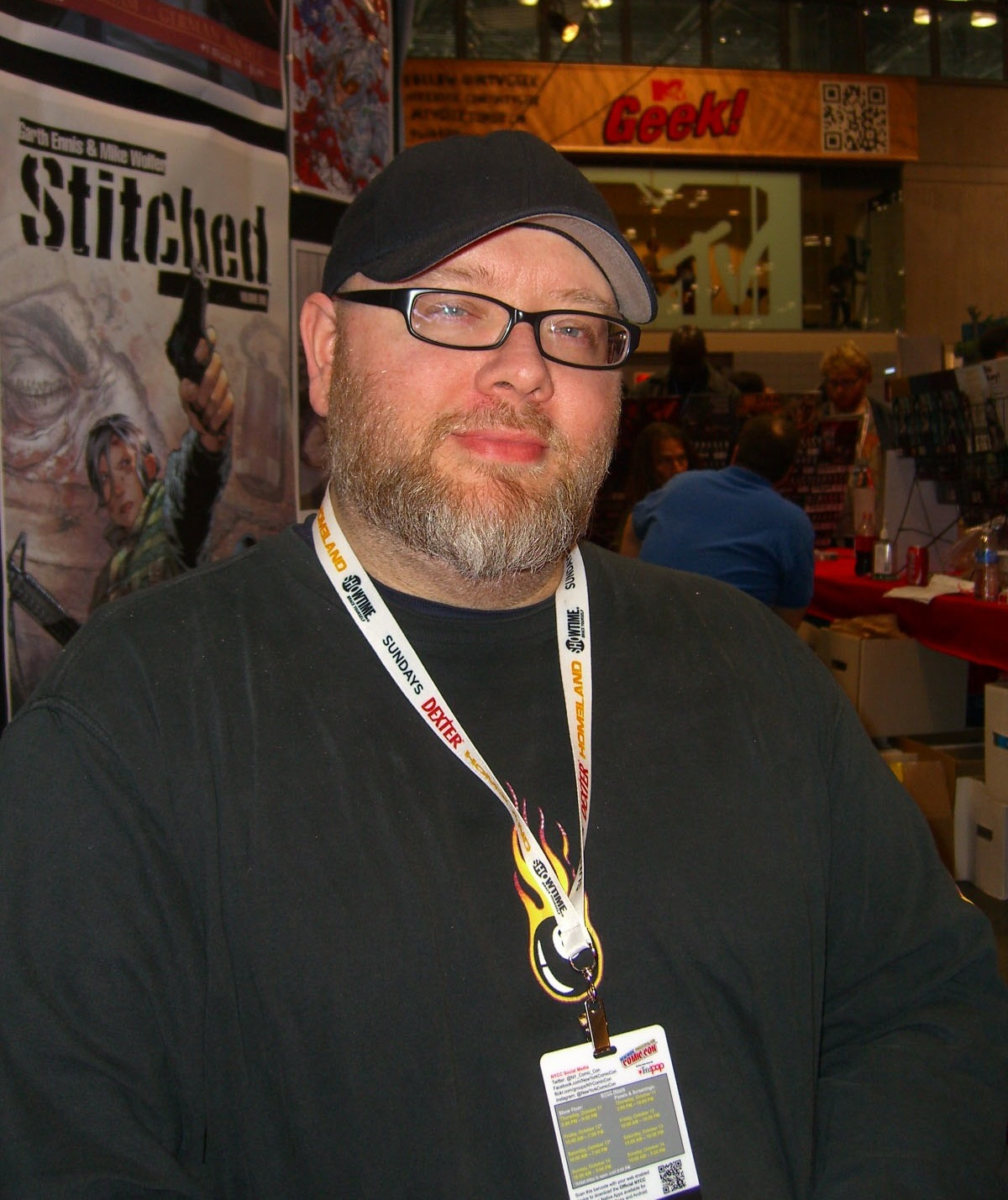
Jacen Burrows (2012)

Jacen Burrows has worked mostly with Avatar Press since 2002, teaming up with writers such as Warren Ellis and Garth Ennis. When he worked on the comic adaptation of the prose story "The Courtyard," he thought it would be his only chance to collaborate with the legendary writer. However, Moore named him as a co-creator for his major Lovecraft comic series, Neonomicon and Providence. Burrows followed Moore's principles of thorough research and historical accuracy, striving to recreate the writer's vision as closely as possible. Moore's comic script is notorious for its length and detail, making Providence the most challenging work of Burrows' career. He reflected on the work as "really exhausting. Finishing it felt like finishing college."

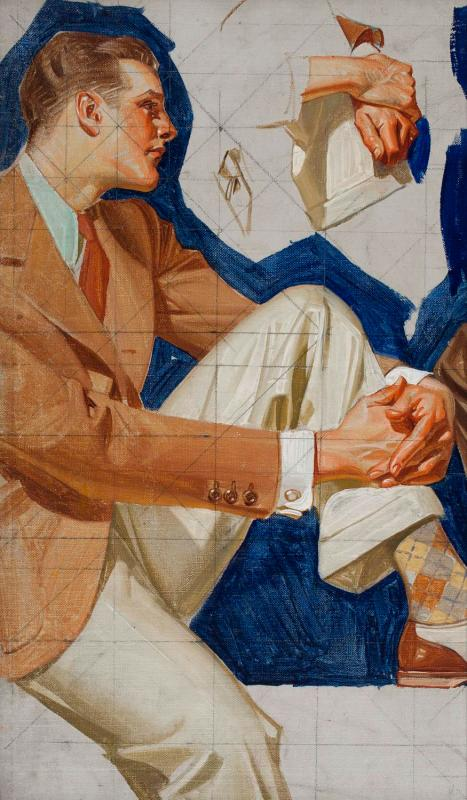
Burrows drew inspirations for his portrayal of male characters in Providence from illustrations of J. C. Leyendecker, a prominent commercial artist of the time.

Moore insisted that his portrayal of the historical United States be completely accurate. He believed that, although Lovecraft's works may seem old-fashioned and over-the-top to modern readers, Lovecraft himself was oriented toward realism. The horror arises from the gap between the unlikely weirdness and the realistic contemporary world of his time. In the artwork for Providence, meticulous research was conducted on props, costumes, and scenery. At times, more than 300 images were referenced for a single building that appeared in the background of a two-page scene, and the characters' movements were detailed using maps of the era. In a panel, the actual pages of that day's newspaper were reproduced. In addition to the materials provided by Moore, Burrows collected fashion books and other resources. The year 1919, situated between World War I and the "Roaring Twenties," had a low cultural profile, making these materials scarce. Burrows utilized municipal and library archives, and watched period films and dramas like Boardwalk Empire, Once Upon a Time in America, and Chaplin films to envision the atmosphere of the time.

Lovecraft often used the term "unnameable" instead of specifically describing monsters and monstrosities. Moore believed this was a deliberate technique for an alienating effect, arguing that depicting the mystical entity Cthulhu as "a monster with tentacles" contradicts Lovecraft's original intent. Drawing the undrawable posed a challenge to Burrows. As he felt his strengths lay in clean lines and clarity of detail, he could not rely on abstraction in his monster scenes to maintain stylistic consistency. Instead, he emphasized the bizarre nature of textures, ensuring that the full picture remained elusive despite clear depiction of his monster. Burrows drew inspiration for monsters from a wide range of earlier works, including the movie The Thing (1982), tabletop role-playing games, and fan art. Notable artists he referenced include Bernie Wrightson (Swamp Thing), Mike Mignola (Hellboy), and Zdzisław Beksiński.

Moore is known for his grid-like, static panel layout. In The Courtyard, each page is divided into two vertical halves, while Neonomicon and Providence feature a format of four horizontal panels stacked vertically. This layout made figure placement difficult, and the dense information in Moore's scripts challenged Burrows' compositional abilities.

== Publication history ==
The first issue of the series was published by Avatar Press in May 2015. Several variants with different covers were produced, including the "Pantheon" edition, featuring supernatural entities from Lovecraft's works, and the "Women of HPL" edition. The final issue, #12, was published in April 2017.

In July 2017, Avatar published Dreadful Beauty: Art of Providence, a book showcasing Jacen Burrows' concept and other artwork. In April 2021, Nightmares Of Providence, a 64-page black-and-white comic book featuring contributions from several artists, was published.

=== Collected editions ===
The series was collected into three individual volumes, each containing four issues. In 2021, a single-volume "compendium" edition was successfully crowdfunded through Kickstarter.

- Providence Act 1 Limited Edition Hardcover (collects Providence #1–4, Avatar Press, 160 pages, May 2016, ISBN 9781592912810)
- Providence Act 2 Limited Edition Hardcover (collects Providence #5–8, Avatar Press, 176 pages, June 2017, ISBN 9781592912926)
- Providence Act 3 Limited Edition Hardcover (collects Providence #9–12, Avatar Press, 144 pages, September 2017, ISBN 9781592912933)
- Providence Compendium (collects Providence #1–12, Avatar Press, 480 pages, 2021, ISBN 9781592913398)

== Styles ==
=== Structure ===
Issues 1 through 10 are set in the year 1919, chronicling the journey of the protagonist, Robert Black, and his encounter with H. P. Lovecraft. Issue 11 concludes Black's story and shifts the timeline back to 2006, the year in which events of Neonomicon took place, also providing an overview of the global reception of Lovecraft's stories. Issue 12 serves as the grand finale, depicting the birth of Cthulhu, as foretold in Neonomicon, and the subsequent rebirth of the world.

=== Panel layout ===
The comic employs a consistent panel layout featuring four horizontal panels stacked vertically on each page. According to English scholar Craig Fischer, this format limits the full depiction of figures within a single panel, with details of architectures and natural objects occupying the peripheries. Fischer suggests that this composition works well with Lovecraft's themes of human insignificance and the lurking horrors at the margins of perception.

Comics scholar Thierry Groensteen notes that regular panel layouts have advantages in defining the basic beats of the narrative, as well as in breaking from them. Matthew Green discusses how Moore uses the modulation of panel layout to create metatextual effects. The beginning of each issue features a full-page panel, which interrupts the story's progress and encourages the reader to ponder the world within the story itself. When the protagonist, Robert Black, enters underground or dreamland, the layout shifts from horizontal to vertical, implying a change in the level of reality being depicted. In the final issue, where the world itself undergoes dynamic transformation, the panel layout becomes more varied.

=== Prose section ===
As is common in Moore's works, each issue up to the tenth includes prose pages. While Watchmen and other works incorporated various styles of text, such as excerpts from newspaper articles and books from the fictional world, Providence features primarily Robert Black's commonplace book. These memoirs reveal Black's feelings, which are not fully expressed in the main comic narrative, adding multiple layers to the story. Sometimes Black's collection of pamphlets and other literary materials are also included, as well as drafts and ideas for a novel he is working on. Matthew Kirschenblatt has noted that these prose segments can be read as an excellent modernist epistolary novel on their own.

Maciej Sulmicki notes that the realistic art in the book closely reflects historical facts, emphasizing the contrast between the "objective" visual representation and the subjective text. In many scenes, Black's memoranda rationalize the anomalies, overlooking the supernatural phenomena implied in the visual narrative. This structure resembles one of the hallmarks of Lovecraft's original works, in which the reader perceives a more terrifying truth than the storyteller comprehends.

== Themes ==
=== Sexuality and queerness ===
Lovecraft notably excluded sex and eroticism from his works, whereas Moore posits that repressed sexuality often manifests as violence. Zachary Rutledge suggests that Moore applied this theory to Lovecraft’s narratives, uncovering underlying violent sexual elements. For instance, in Lovecraft’s "The Dunwich Horror," a woman bears a child with the cosmic entity Yog-Sothoth, but her individuality is only superficially addressed. Moore’s retelling of this episode focuses on the woman's non-consensual impregnation and the resulting trauma. Another Lovecraft story, "The Thing on the Doorstep", features a villain who body-swaps with others. Moore's adaptation further explored the horror of physical violation through depiction of rape, suggesting that the original work also implied intercourse without consent. Rutledge argues that Moore’s approach constructs a modern horror by confronting these elements, which are now viewed as misogynistic.

Dave Whittaker argues that Providence subtly addresses queer cultural history. Moore, a longstanding advocate for LGBTQ+ rights, had previously expressed his support through his 1988 poem The Mirror of Love, which protested anti-homosexual legislation in England, recounting how Christian society had occultized ancient cultures where homosexuality was accepted. Whittaker contends that Moore effectively merges this historical perspective on homosexuality with contemporary notions of diversity, while also intertwining it with Lovecraft's works, which reflected conservative values in the early 20th-century.

Gay characters in Providence are depicted wearing green ties and red bow ties, a custom Moore incorporated from his research into early 20th-century gay culture. These accessories subtly signal the characters' sexual orientation, though their meaning is not explicitly conveyed to the reader. Robert Black makes discreet sexual advances toward several men throughout the series, with his first overt sexual encounter occurring in issue #9. Shortly afterward, Black learns of his new friend H. P. Lovecraft's homophobic views, highlighting the source of his concealment and fears to the reader.

=== Social commentary ===
Matthew Green argues that the comic’s characters and narrative are deeply intertwined with real-world issues as well as Lovecraft’s universe, reflecting Moore’s belief that "culture – generated through a combination of desire and imagination – is fundamentally bound together with the world of material relations." The Stella Sapiente society, which overthrows the human world in the story, is composed predominantly of elderly white men who discard those they consider genetically or intellectually inferior, while exploiting women, children, and people of color. This portrayal can be seen as an epitome of American history and society. Moore’s adaptation of "Pickman's Model", which originally focuses on art and its interpretation, introduces a political dimension absent from Lovecraft's story, specifically referencing the 1919 Boston police strike. This addition may serve as a critique of both Lovecraft’s anti-communist stance and the contemporary political climate of the 2010s. Some critics draw parallels between the themes in Providence and the 2016 U.S. presidential election, which coincides with the series' publication.

Literary scholar Jackson Ayers notes that "(the series') violence and bleakness, moreover, convey what Moore sees as the horrific realities of contemporary culture." Ayers argues that Moore critiques the ideological legacy inherited from pulp novels to contemporary American comics by exploring Lovecraft’s covert racism, misogyny, and dysfunctional sexuality. By the series' conclusion, the "fragile construct" of "human reality" is dismantled, revealing a chaotic and irrational nature of the world. The characters accept this transformation as "Providence." Ayers interprets this as Moore’s commentary on the moral dangers posed by prolonged Conservative governance in the UK, which Moore criticizes, as well as the populist rhetoric and incitement exemplified by figures like Donald Trump.

In reviewing the series, Matthew Kirschenblatt quotes Moore as saying that the increased flow of information at the turn of the century marked a critical point in human society. According to Kirschenblatt, the series portrays the fear that the advent of popular media has facilitated the dissemination of a type of culture that was originally oral in nature, resulted in trivial information becoming so pervasive that critical thinking is being diminished. Similarly, Matthew Green notes that the mythical world overcame human reality in the story not because it was a truer form of the world, but because it was a stronger fiction. Green interprets the narrative as a critique of the proliferation of popular discourses, such as exclusionist ones.

=== Art, magic, and mysticism ===
It's pretty much a fact that our entire universe is a mental construct. We don't actually deal with reality directly. We simply compose a picture of reality from what's going on in our retinas, in the timpani of our ears, and in our nerve endings. We perceive our own perception, and that perception is to us the entirety of the universe. I believe magic is, on one level, the willful attempt to alter those perceptions.

— Alan Moore (2013)

Alan Moore is a mystic and a self-proclaimed magician, well known for his assertion that art is a form of magic in which the artist, like the shamans of ancient societies, can exert power over reality. This series depicts the world transformed by Lovecraft's expression, demonstrating that memes have the power to change perceptions, a power Moore refers to as magic. Matthew Green writes that Moore expands on this idea, highlighting the roles of the humanities, literary criticism, philology, and archives, alongside the arts, in the working of "magic."

As incorporated in Chapter 11 of the series as metafiction, Lovecraft's creations have been perceived by some occultists as embodying true mystical knowledge. British mystic Kenneth Grant claimed that Lovecraft had received revelations from mystical beings through dreams. Chaos magic, which emerged in the 1970s, blurs the line between fiction and reality, suggesting that fictional deities such as Cthulhu and Yog-Sothoth are communicable entities. Although Moore dismisses the notion of Lovecraft's work being genuinely occult — labeling it "astral cosplay" and "certainly not important magic" — he does acknowledge the subversive power of fiction. As Jake Poller explains, fiction can be incorporated into the human imagination to subvert the "prosaic fiction of reality", a process Moore refers to as magic.

=== Meta-narratives ===
Moore states that he employed similar approaches in Providence as in several of his earlier comics. Using a highly realistic setting for an improbable genre, such as horror, mirrors his revision of the superhero genre in Watchmen (1986). The exploration of American culture and society through deconstruction of American horror was previously attempted in the "American Gothic" story arc (1985) from Swamp Thing. The meticulous recreation of a historical period in Providence is comparable to the thoroughness seen in From Hell (1989).

M. Cecilia Marchetto Santorun argues that Moore's Cthulhu cycle reverses the theme of "the power of imagination" explored in works such as Promethea (1999). In Promethea, the heroine ends the old world by liberating the human spirit through imagination and merging it with the eternal. In contrast, Providence depicts the darker side of imagining the sublime. While the "end of the world" brought by Cthulhu in Providence seems to offer liberation from a corrupt and oppressive reality, it ultimately leads to a realm where all meaning is utterly lost. The Cthulhu cult in the comic engages in unrestricted orgies and interracial sex, thereby unintentionally materializing the malevolent god. Santorun notes that this serves as a critique of the counterculture movement, which promised utopian freedom and spiritual liberation— a movement that also significantly influenced Moore's own development. Craig Fischer further contrasts Providence with Promethea, observing that Promethea represents an essentially good universe where one can achieve transcendent peace through spiritual quests symbolized by the Sephiroth. In Providence, however, characters draw evil forces from the same Sephiroth to violate others' existence.

Craig Fischer suggests that Providence functions as a metafictional summation of Moore's own career as a comics creator. Moore has frequently clashed with major U.S. publishers over adaptations and spin-offs, and has even had disputes with fans who support these publishers. Over time, Moore grew increasingly critical of both the comics industry and its fandom, eventually announcing his retirement in 2016. Providence was one of his final comic works, and Fischer theorizes that Moore symbolically reflects on his achievements in comics through the Lovecraftian Mythos in the story. Similarly, Matthew Kirschenblatt notes that the ending—where a character abandons everything and tear up a book—could symbolize Moore’s departure. Kirschenblatt added that the ending might be open to multiple interpretations, much like Moore’s earlier works like Watchmen. The triumph of the inhuman world over the free will is one interpretation, while another possibility is that the pieces of paper that represent rebellion sink into the subconscious of the new world, potentially resurfacing in the future.

== Reception ==
The series received a 9.3 rating from critics and a 9.4 rating by general readers on the review aggregator Comic Book Roundup. The first paperback volume was nominated for a 2016 Bram Stoker Award in the graphic novel category. Critic Tom Shapira praised the series on the website of The Comics Journal, calling it one of the best of the 2010s, though he noted that it requires prior knowledge to appreciate.

The H. P. Lovecraft Historical Society, an international group of enthusiasts, lauded the book as "brilliantly researched ... like looking at Lovecraft's works again for the very first time." In Lovecraft in the 21st Century, Tom Shapira commended the book for its accurate portrayal of Lovecraft's personality and habits. He also highlighted how Lovecraft and his contemporaries fictionalized each other, and praised the blend of fiction and reality that offers a more authentic depiction of Lovecraft than a straightforward biography. In 2023, literary scholar Steve Corbeil noted the increasing efforts in the Mythos genre in America to critically address the racism, misogyny, and homophobia of its originators, citing this series as a notable example.

Akira Okawada, writing for a Japanese fantasy fiction magazine, praised the novel for transcending parody to offer a radical re-telling. He singled out Chapter 7 as "one of the most convincing adaptations" of "Pickman's Model." Dave Whittaker, reviewing for the comics research website Sequart, wrote that the comic elicits "horror, heightened awareness, joy, curiosity, ... a strange brew of seemingly contrary reactions." He also highlighted that the book introduces elements of emotion and sexuality not present in Lovecraft's original work.

A reviewer for the H. P. Lovecraft Historical Society described the subdued storytelling of the early chapters as "an exercise in subtlety that cleverly ratchets up tension in spite of very little obviously happening." The Guardian praised the subtle integration of horror elements into the everyday landscape, calling it "not merely jarring but genuinely shocking." Bleeding Cool described the comic as "true horror" highlighting its portrayal of "acceptance of failure, of impotence, of helplessness, of submission to doom," in contrast to Hollywood's formula of "jump scares and gaining control to defeat the monster". Gerard Gibson, writing in Irish Journal of Gothic and Horror Studies, praised the series' "a more abject apocalypse" for accurately representing Lovecraft's worldview, where human existence is deemed worthless. He also noted that the comic is significant for "delivering original and genuinely disturbing horror" even by the standard of today, when horror has permeated a wide range of genres.

Jacen Burrows' art have been met by mixed reactions among fans, with some appreciating his clean style while others criticizing his lack of dynamism. Craig Fischer, writing in The Comics Journal, noted that Burrows's calm, realistic style is effective for the story that starts quietly and then suddenly turns horrifyingly bizarre. Other reviewers have praised Burrows for his precise contours and rich details.

== Works cited ==
- Ayres, Jackson (2021). Alan Moore: A Critical Guide (Kindle ed.). Bloomsbury Publishing. ISBN 978-1-3500-6048-7.
- Burrows, Jacen; Moore, Alan (2017). "The Undrawable: Jacen Burrows and the Art of Providence". Dreadful Beauty: Art of Providence (sample ed.). Avatar. pp. 3–6. ASIN B0774PSMH6.
- Corbeil, Steve (2023). "Exploring Strategies of Reappropriation Related to the Cthulhu Mythos: A Comparison of Two Competing Models of Adaptation". 翻訳の文化/文化の翻訳. 18: 77–85. doi:10.14945/00029538.
- Gibson, Gerard (2017). "Alan Moore and Jacen Burrows, Providence". Irish Journal of Gothic and Horror Studies (16): 214–218.
- Green, Matthew J. A. (2017). "'An altered view regarding the relationship between dreams and reality': Magic, politics and the comics medium in Alan Moore and Jacen Burrow's Providence". Studies in Comics. 8 (2): 135–155. doi:10.1386/stic.8.2.135_1.
- Greve, Julius; Zappe, Florian (2020). American Weird: Concept and Medium. Bloomsbury Publishing.
- Parkin, Lance (2013). Magic Words: The Extraordinary Life of Alan Moore (Kindle ed.). Aurum. ISBN 978-1-78131-146-2.
- Poller, Jake (2021). "A Kind of Magic: Dreams and the Occult in Alan Moore's Providence". Journal of the Fantastic in the Arts. 32 (2): 70–89.
- Rutledge, Zachary (2024). "Hell as an Exploration of Sin". Mythlore. 42 (2): 161–178. JSTOR 48771995.
- Santorun, M. Cecilia Marchetto (2020). "'Terrible monsters Sin-bred': Blakean monstrosity in Alan Moore's graphic novels". Palgrave Communications. 6 (1). Palgrave Macmillan: 1–15. doi:10.1057/s41599-020-0451-2.
- Shapira, Tom (2021). "Man or Cartoon: H.P. Lovecraft as a Comics Character". In Gonzalez, Antonio Alcala; Sederholm, Carl H (eds.). Lovecraft in the 21st Century: Dead, But Still Dreaming. Routledge. doi:10.4324/9780367713065-7.
- Sulmicki, Maciej (2019). "Studies in Madness: Reality and Subjectivity in Alan Moore's Providence, Ambrose Bierce's "An Inhabitant of Carcosa" and Robert W. Chambers' "The Repairer of Reputations"". Vistula University Working Papers. 65 (2): 36–45.
- 岡和田, 晃 (2024). "レイシズムとセクシズムの暴力を根底から炙り出す―アラン・ムーア&ジェイセン・バロウズ『ネオノミコン プロビデンス』Act1&2". ナイトランド・クォーターリー (in Japanese). 35: 43.
