= Ahwahnee Principles =

Set of urban planning guidelines

The Ahwahnee Principles are a set of guidelines that emphasize sustainable urban planning practices. These principles have developed alongside the New Urbanism movement, which incorporates mixed-use, walkable, compact, and transit-oriented elements in community planning. They were developed by the California-based Local Government Commission in 1991, a group of architects and other professionals urban design. "Ahwahnee" is derived from a name for the Yosemite Valley in California. The Ahwahnee Principles have since expanded to other actions such as the Ahwahnee Principles for Economic Development (1997), the Ahwahnee Water Principle (2005), and the Ahwahnee Principles for Climate Change (2008) by the Local Government Commission.

== Community principles ==
The following principles, also noted as the Ahwahnee Principles for Resource-Efficient Communities were made by the Local Government Commission in 1991:

1. All Planning should be in the form of complete and integrated communities containing housing, shops, work places, schools, parks and civic facilities essential to the daily life of the resident.
2. Community size should be designed so that housing, jobs, daily needs and other activities are within easy walking distance of each other.
3. As many activities as possible should be located within easy walking distance of transit stops.
4. A community should contain a diversity of housing types to enable citizens from a wide range of economic levels and age groups to live within its boundaries.
5. Businesses within the community should provide a range of job types for the community’s residents.
6. The location and character of the community should be consistent with a larger transit network.
7. The community should have a center focus that combines commercial, civic, cultural and recreational uses.
8. The community should contain an ample supply of specialized open space in the form of squares, greens and parks whose frequent use is encouraged through placement and design.
9. Public spaces should be designed to encourage the attention and presence of people at all hours of the day and night.
10. Each community or cluster of communities should have a well defined edge, such as agricultural greenbelts or wildlife corridors, permanently protected from development.
11. Streets, pedestrian paths and bike paths should contribute to a system of fully connected and interesting routes to all destinations. Their design should encourage pedestrian and bicycle use by being small and spatially defined by buildings, trees and lighting; and by discouraging high-speed traffic.
12. Wherever possible, the natural terrain, drainage, and vegetation of the community should be preserved with superior examples contained within parks or greenbelts.
13. The community design should help conserve resources and minimize waste.
14. Communities should provide for the efficient use of water through the use of natural drainage, drought tolerant landscaping and recycling.
15. The street orientation, the placement of buildings and the use of shading should contribute to the energy efficiency of the community.
