= Alan Moore's The Courtyard =

2003 comic book series

- Alan Moore's The Courtyard TPB (2004), art by Jacen Burrows

Publication information
- Publisher: Avatar Press
- Schedule: Monthly
- Format: Limited series
- Genre: Horror
- Publication date: January – February 2003
- No. of issues: 2

Creative team
- Created by: Alan Moore; Jacen Burrows
- Written by: Alan Moore (original story); Antony Johnston (adaptation)
- Artist: Jacen Burrows
- Editor(s): William A. Christensen; Alan Moore

Collected editions
- Deluxe Hardcover Set: ISBN 1-59291-017-3

Alan Moore's The Courtyard is a two-issue comic book mini-series published in 2003 by Avatar Press. The comic was adapted by Antony Johnston with artwork by Jacen Burrows from a 1994 prose story by Alan Moore (credited as "consulting editor").

== Plot ==
Aldo Sax is an FBI agent using "anomaly theory", a method that correlates seemingly unrelated data into a cohesive whole, to investigate three seemingly unrelated ritual murders around the United States. His investigation leads him to a nightclub in Red Hook, Brooklyn, where he hears of a psychoactive drug called Aklo, peddled by a mysterious veiled man named Johnny Carcosa. Sax sets up a meet with Carcosa at the dealer's apartment building, where he is given a hallucinogenic white powder as a prelude to the Aklo. Carcosa speaks an unknown language to Sax, who experiences visions of spectral planes and hideous primordial creatures, while understanding the truth that Aklo is not a drug, but the language Carcosa spoke to him. The visions, given to him by Aklo, drive Sax to murder his neighbor using the same modus operandi as the killers he was investigating.

== Publication history ==
The original 1994 prose story had first appeared in an anthology The Starry Wisdom: A Tribute to H. P. Lovecraft (Creation Books, 1995, ISBN 1-871592-32-1).

The comic book adaptation was planned to appear in Alan Moore's Yuggoth Cultures and Other Growths, but it was published as a limited series by Avatar in January and February 2003.

=== Collected editions ===
The series was collected in a trade paperback in 2003, a second version (the Companion) was released in 2004, which contained annotations by H. P. Lovecraft scholar N. G. Christakos and reprinted Moore's original short story. A limited edition hardcover set of the two volumes was also released in 2004. In 2009 a full color version was released separately, as well as in a collection with Moore's sequel series Neonomicon.

- Alan Moore's The Courtyard (Avatar Press, softcover, 56 pages, 2004, ISBN 1-59291-015-7)
- Alan Moore's The Courtyard Companion (Avatar Press, softcover, 72 pages, 2004, ISBN 1-59291-016-5)
- Alan Moore's The Courtyard Deluxe Hardcover Set (Avatar Press, hardcover, 128 pages, 2004, ISBN 1-59291-017-3)
- Alan Moore's The Courtyard (Color Edition) (Avatar Press, 56 pages, 11 March 2009, ISBN 1-59291-060-2)

== Sequel ==
Alan Moore has written a 4-part sequel to The Courtyard called Neonomicon, the final issue of which was released by Avatar on 23 March 2011. Moore's 2015–17 comic Providence is a further continuation in the series.

== Sources ==
- Alan Moore's The Courtyard at the Grand Comics Database
- Alan Moore's The Courtyard at the Comic Book DB (archived from the original)
