= Courtyard housing =

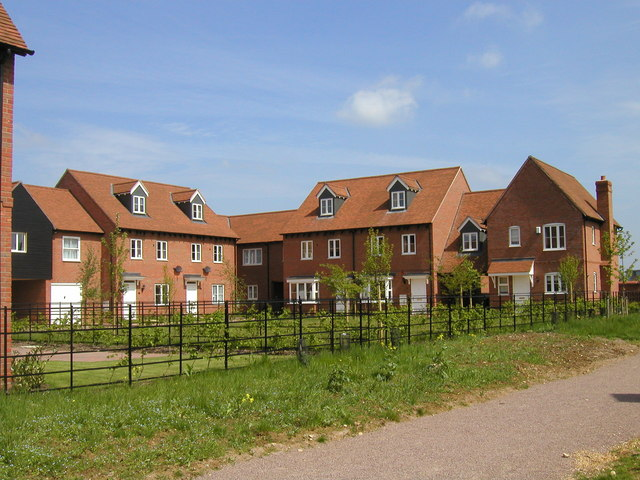
Housing courtyard at Cherry Way, Lower Cambourne

Courtyard housing is a distinct medium-density multi-family housing typology centered on a shared outdoor open space or garden and surrounded by one or two stories of apartment units typically only accessed by courtyard from the street (and not by an interior corridor). Courtyard housing developed independently in many cultures around the world as a response to particular local needs and economic and social factors.

The courtyard housing typology in the US was developed in the Los Angeles area in the 1920s by several small-scale developers in response to the region's climate and housing needs, and typically adopted a Mediterranean or Spanish Colonial architectural style. The courtyards would be quiet and shaded outdoor spaces that served as a transition between the street and the individual apartment units, and were primarily aesthetic and non-recreational in nature. In the years following, the typology was implemented across the United States until around the time of World War II, when the automobile became more dominant in daily life and had more of an impact on the built environment; newer housing typologies were developed in response to it, such as the dingbat.

In recent years the Courtyard Housing typology has re-emerged following the publication of the book Courtyard Housing in Los Angeles by Roger Sherwood, James Tice and Stefanos Polyzoides, as well as to suit a contemporary need for a housing typology with a density level between that of a single- or double-family house and that of a traditional higher density apartment building. In 2007, the City of Portland Planning Bureau held a design competition for new designs based on the courtyard housing model for new infill housing in existing neighborhoods.

While courtyards have been a part of buildings for millennia, "courtyard housing" in this sense does not refer merely to any housing structure with a courtyard.

== See also ==
- Bungalow court
- Courtyard
- Housing
