= I'On, Mount Pleasant, South Carolina =

Mixed-use neighbourhood in South Carolina, USA

Coordinates: 32.813538°N 79.879972°W

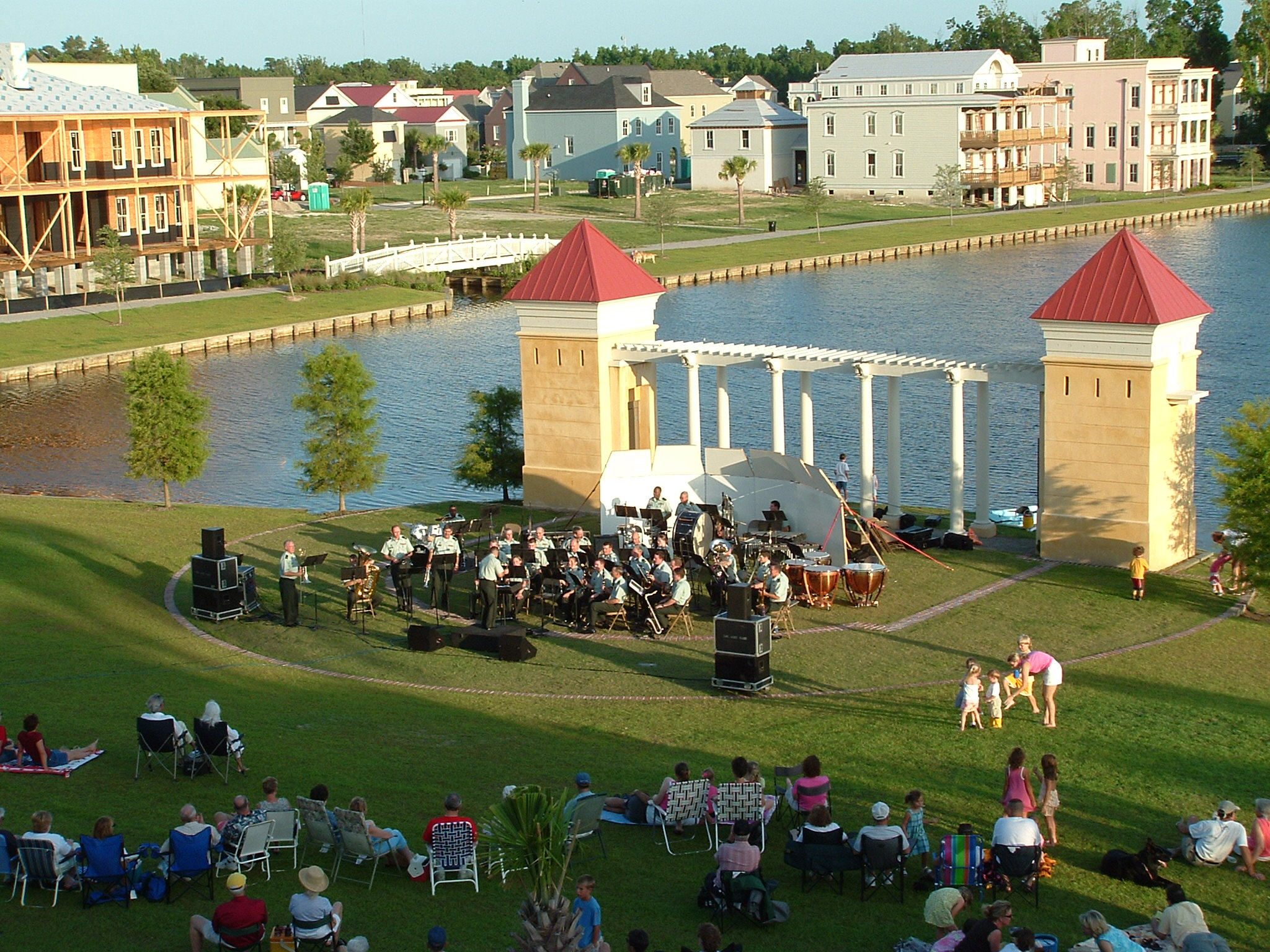
Concert at Amphitheater in I'On, June 2004

I'On is a mixed-use New Urbanist Traditional Neighborhood Development (TND) style community located in Mount Pleasant, South Carolina, United States just northeast of Charleston. I'On was one of the earliest full-time residential New Urbanist communities developed in the US.

== Location and origin ==
I'On is approximately three miles (5 km) east of the Arthur Ravenel Bridge, which connects Charleston and Mount Pleasant. Adjacent to the I'On Club is East Cooper Montessori Charter School, the first public charter Montessori school in the state.

The community was founded and planned under the direction of Vince Graham, who previously established the Newpoint community in Beaufort, South Carolina. Founded on April 30, 1995, I'On was planned as an example of the New Urbanism, which includes traditional neighborhood development. I'On was designed by the town planning firms of Dover, Kohl & Partners and Duany Plater-Zyberk & Company.

During a "land-blessing ceremony", where the planners and Vince Graham waded into the tidal flat of Hobcaw Creek, they came across an old burial ground. One of the grave-markers read "Jacob Bond I'On" – an early landowner, politician, and soldier in the Revolutionary War. It was decided: the development would be called I'On.

The master plan concept for I'On came together over an intensive seven-day design charrette, which took place in a historic house on King Street in Downtown Charleston. The overall urban planning would be dictated by three large existing excavations from previous sand quarrying. The streets would form around these pits, which were turned into lakes.

The community was controversial when proposed, and initial plans for a more urban and diverse village of over 1,200 units, including multifamily homes and rented residences, were eventually compromised in the planning process to a buildout of approximately 762 single family homes, a village square, and locations for civic buildings such as churches and schools. Development plans were delayed by a lengthy legal contest with the Town of Mount Pleasant which ended with the South Carolina Supreme Court ruling in the I'On Company's favor.

In 2010, two I’on residents, Brad Walbeck and Lea Ann Adkins, filed suit against the I’On Company stating that certain amenities presented in marketing materials were not handed over to the HOA as promised. After lengthy appeals, finally in 2023 the South Carolina Supreme Court ruled in Walbeck and Adkins favor, and the homeowners prevailed. The I’On defendants were ordered to pay the HOA $1.75 million. See Walbeck vs. I’on.
