= Prospect New Town =

New Urbanist housing development in Colorado, USA

Coordinates: 40.135619°N 105.105579°W

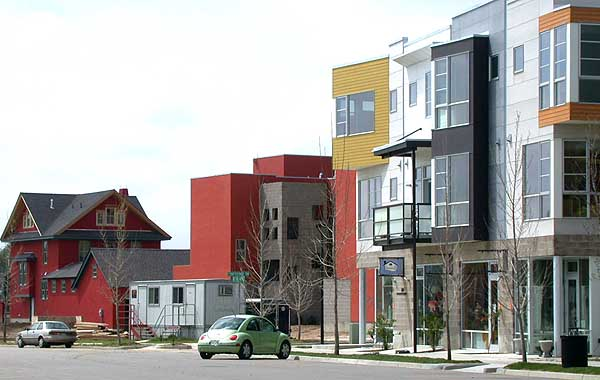
View south of Tenacity Drive in Prospect New Town showing a mix of aggregate housing and traditional detached homes.

Prospect New Town is a New Urbanist housing development located on the southern edge of the city of Longmont in Boulder County, Colorado, in the United States. The first full-scale new urbanist new development in Colorado, it was developed starting in the mid-1990s by Kiki Wallace and designed by the firm of Duany Plater Zyberk & Company, who also designed the new urbanist communities of Seaside, Florida, and Kentlands in Gaithersburg, Maryland. As of 2009, the project is in its sixth phase of development. It is intended to have a population of approximately 2,000 people in 585 units on 340 lots.

== Description ==
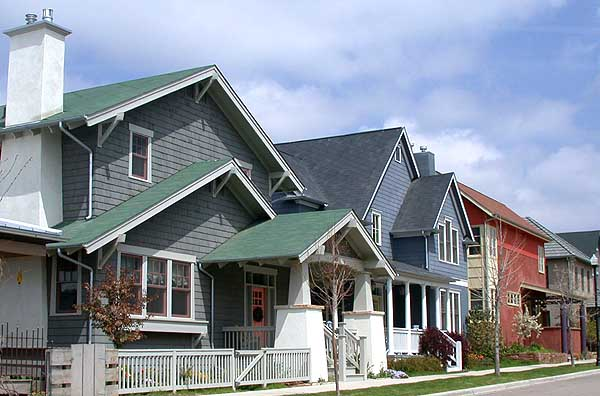
Traditional housing styles along a residential street in Prospect New Town

The development is being built on the site of an 80-acre (32 ha) tree farm formerly owned by Wallace's family. It sits along the west side of U.S. Highway 287 just south of Pike Road. The development incorporates a broad mix of traditional and modern designs, mixed to create an eclectic feel. Although planned by DPZ, the individual units are designed by a variety of architects, who are encouraged to experiment with styles. It includes a heterogeneous mix of businesses, detached homes, row houses, live/work lofts, and apartments. The original farmhouse and other structures have been integrated into the development, in part to retain continuity with the former use of the property. Some of the new structures resemble traditional housing styles from early in the 20th century, while others are very eclectic and ultramodern.

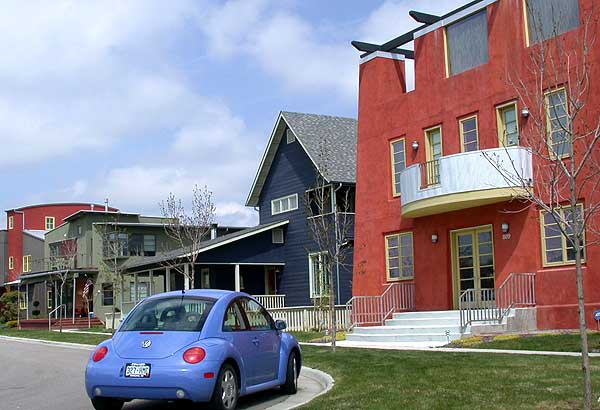
A residential area showing mixed architectural styles of detached homes in Prospect New Town

Keeping to new urbanist principles espoused by Andres Duany and Elizabeth Plater-Zyberk (the partners of DPZ) and others, the plan of the community forgoes traditional suburban features such as large front lawns, uniform featureless fronts dominated by large garage doors, and segregation of housing from businesses. Instead, the development is designed with small yards and higher density, to create a traditional neighborhood look and feel. It is also designed to be pedestrian friendly, not only in the amenities such as sidewalks, but in promoting the desirability of walking short distances within the complex. Houses and lots in the project are typically smaller than in U.S. suburban developments. The typical house in the project has an area 5,100 square feet (470 m^{2}) of living space on a 7,000 square foot (650 m^{2}) lot. Prices for houses in the project initially ranged from 150,000–500,000 USD, but have trended quickly upward because of the high demand and the overall growth of real estate prices in the area.

The development includes a town center interwoven into the center of the residential area, with businesses ranging from restaurants to professional offices. The streets are oriented to maximize the view of the mountains, and a traditional town center that would be no more than five minutes on foot from any place in the neighborhood. It would include not only houses but also stores and offices that themselves would have living spaces upstairs, in the manner of many older traditional two-story commercial properties.

Due to the bright colors and eclectic architecture of the buildings, many area residents refer to Prospect as "Toon Town".

== History ==
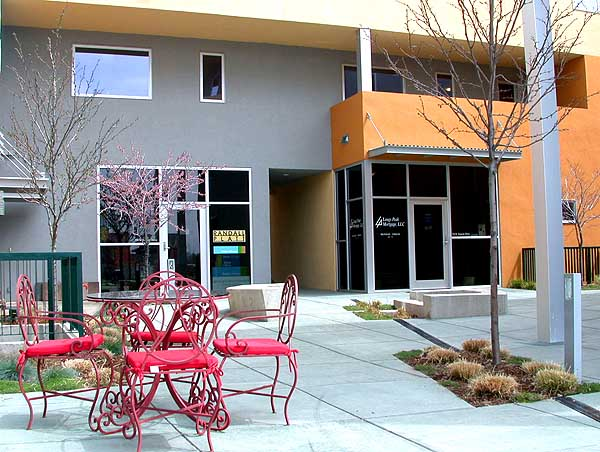
Courtyard of a commercial structure along Tenacity Drive in Prospect New Town. The building shown here is less than 100 meters from the streets with detached homes, allowing quick commutes and easy access for residents.

Wallace, who reportedly disliked suburbia, had previously bought the tree farm from his family and had wondered how to develop it in a tasteful way when he read an article in the Wall Street Journal about Duany and the New Urbanist movement. Wallace, together with Duany and Longmont developer Dale Bruns, began planning the unique development in the middle 1990s. The development was to serve as a test case for traditional neighborhoods in the planning stages along the Colorado Front Range.

The parcel of land offered a full view of the nearby mountains, including Longs Peak. The development, at first called the "Wallace Addition" and the "Burlington Village", was to be financed at 37 million dollars. The partners also hired the Rocky Mountain Institute, based in Snowmass, Colorado, as consultants for the use of ecologically-friendly building materials and planning. The design calls for the eventual construction of nine small parks integrated throughout the houses and businesses. Some of the units will have apartments above garages, a traditional feature that will allow renters to live in the neighborhood and will allow homeowners to reduce mortgage payments. Other traditional features included in the project are the use of rear lanes, a feature that was once prevalent in the grid plans of most U.S. towns but which has been banished from suburbia. Duany has long espoused the use of rear lanes as leading to a better integration of automobile and foot traffic in a neighborhood.

As was the case with many New Urbanist projects in the United States, the proposal violated numerous local zoning ordinances and met with much initial resistance from local planning authorities and other agencies. In particular, the project's density did not have the required open space; the local fire and police departments objected to the narrowness of streets; and the Colorado Department of Transportation objected that the project had too many curb cuts. Wallace, Bruns, and Duany struggled throughout 1994 to convince the local and state authorities to allow the project. The struggle is reflected in Wallace's choice of street names in the project: the main thoroughfare off U.S. 287 is called "Tenacity Drive." The struggle of the three men paid off, however, and in the following year, many initial doubters came to embrace the project. In October 1995 the Longmont Planning Board granted the appropriate variances and unanimously approved the project, on the grounds that "this is what people want." The project was strongly backed by Longmont mayor Leona Stoecker.

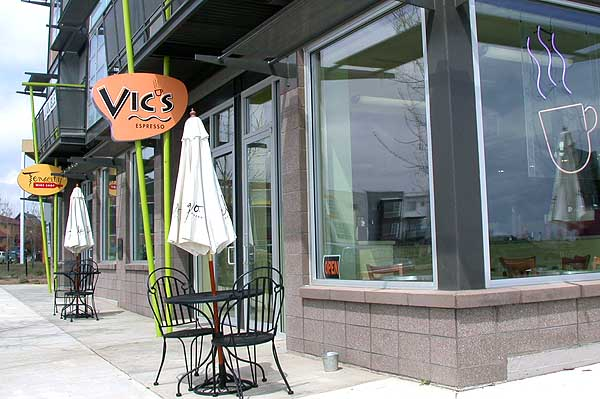
Coffeeshop and wine store along Tenacity Drive, just off U.S. Highway 287, in Prospect New Town

The first building phase was to include 65 lots. By the time of the approval of the planning board in 1995, Wallace had already pre-sold 35 of the lots. The initial success and enthusiasm prompted interest from other such developers. A developer from Colorado Springs began planning a similar development nearby. The nearby city of Broomfield likewise contacted California planner Peter Calthorpe, who espouses many New Urbanist ideas, to begin designing a master plan for their community.
