= Jeff Speck =

American city planner, writer, and lecturer

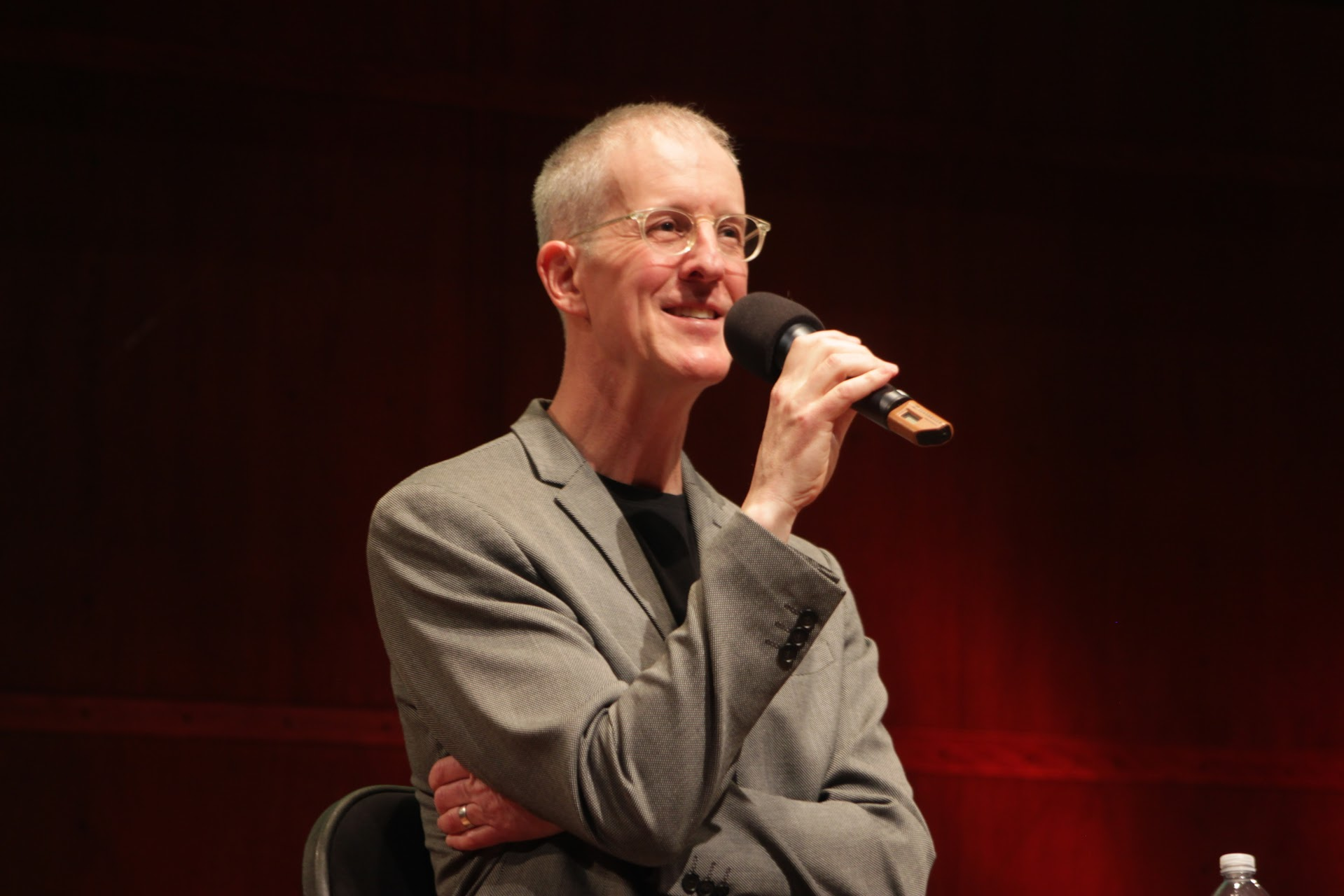
- Speck in 2017
- Education: BA; MFA; MArch
- Alma mater: Williams College; Syracuse University; Harvard University
- Occupations: City planner; Writer; Lecturer
- Works: Suburban Nation; The Smart Growth Manual; Walkable City

Jeff Speck is an American city planner, writer, and lecturer who is the principal at the urban design and consultancy firm, Speck Dempsey. He has authored or co-authored several books on urban planning, including his 2012 book, Walkable City: How Downtown Saves America, One Step at a Time. He is an advocate for New Urbanism and more "walkable" cities and has given TED Talks on the subjects.

== Early life and education ==
Speck grew up in Belmont, Massachusetts. He earned a BA from Williams College, where he graduated magna cum laude in 1985. After graduating from Williams, Speck attended Syracuse University, where he earned an MFA in art history. He then attended Harvard University, earning a Master of Architecture.

== Career ==
Speck began his urban design career at Duany Plater-Zyberk & Company (now DPZ CoDesign) where, over the course of 10 years, he became the Director of Town Planning. While at DPZ, Speck co-authored (with Andrés Duany and Elizabeth Plater-Zyberk) a book entitled, Suburban Nation: The Rise of Sprawl and the Decline of the American Dream. Published in 2000, the book details the effects of urban sprawl on cities and offers a plan for improved urban redevelopment.

From 2003 to 2007, Speck was the Director of Design at the National Endowment for the Arts (NEA). While there, he oversaw the Mayors' Institute on City Design and created the Governors' Institute on Community Design. After leaving the NEA, Speck started his own urban design consultancy firm, Speck & Associates, which was originally based in Washington, D.C. As part of the business, Speck has created master plans and waterfront plans for a variety of cities including, Lowell, Massachusetts; Memphis, Tennessee; Grand Rapids, Michigan; and Tampa, Florida. In 2008, Speck completed construction on his family's house in Washington, D.C. The three-story building sits on a flatiron lot and measures about 500 square feet per floor. It was profiled in The Washington Post Magazine soon after its completion.

In 2009, Speck co-authored The Smart Growth Manual with Andrés Duany and Mike Lydon. The book offers a wide variety of New Urbanist planning principles and techniques. In 2012, Speck released his book, Walkable City: How Downtown Can Save America, One Step at a Time. The book is split into two parts, with the first part detailing Speck's "General Theory of Walkability." The second part provides Speck's ten-step process toward attaining walkability in cities. Walkable City was the best-selling city-planning book of 2013 and 2014. Speck gave two TED Talks on the subject in 2013 and has given numerous lectures on the topic since.

In 2015, Speck's firm was hired by businessman, Jeff Vinik, to design and plan the $1-billion redevelopment of downtown Tampa. By that time, Speck had also relocated his family and business (Speck & Associates) to Brookline, Massachusetts.

== Bibliography ==
Year	Title	Original publisher	ISBN	Notes
2000	Suburban Nation: The Rise of Sprawl and the Decline of the American Dream	North Point Press	ISBN 9780865477506	Co-authored with Andrés Duany and Elizabeth Plater-Zyberk
2009	The Smart Growth Manual	McGraw-Hill Education	ISBN 9780071376754	Co-authored with Andrés Duany and Mike Lydon
2012	Walkable City: How Downtown Can Save America, One Step at a Time	Farrar, Straus and Giroux	ISBN 9780865477728	Best-selling city-planning book of 2013 and 2014.
2018	Walkable City Rules: 101 Steps to Making Better Places	Island Press	ISBN 9781610918985	
