= Livability =

Degree to which a place is good for living

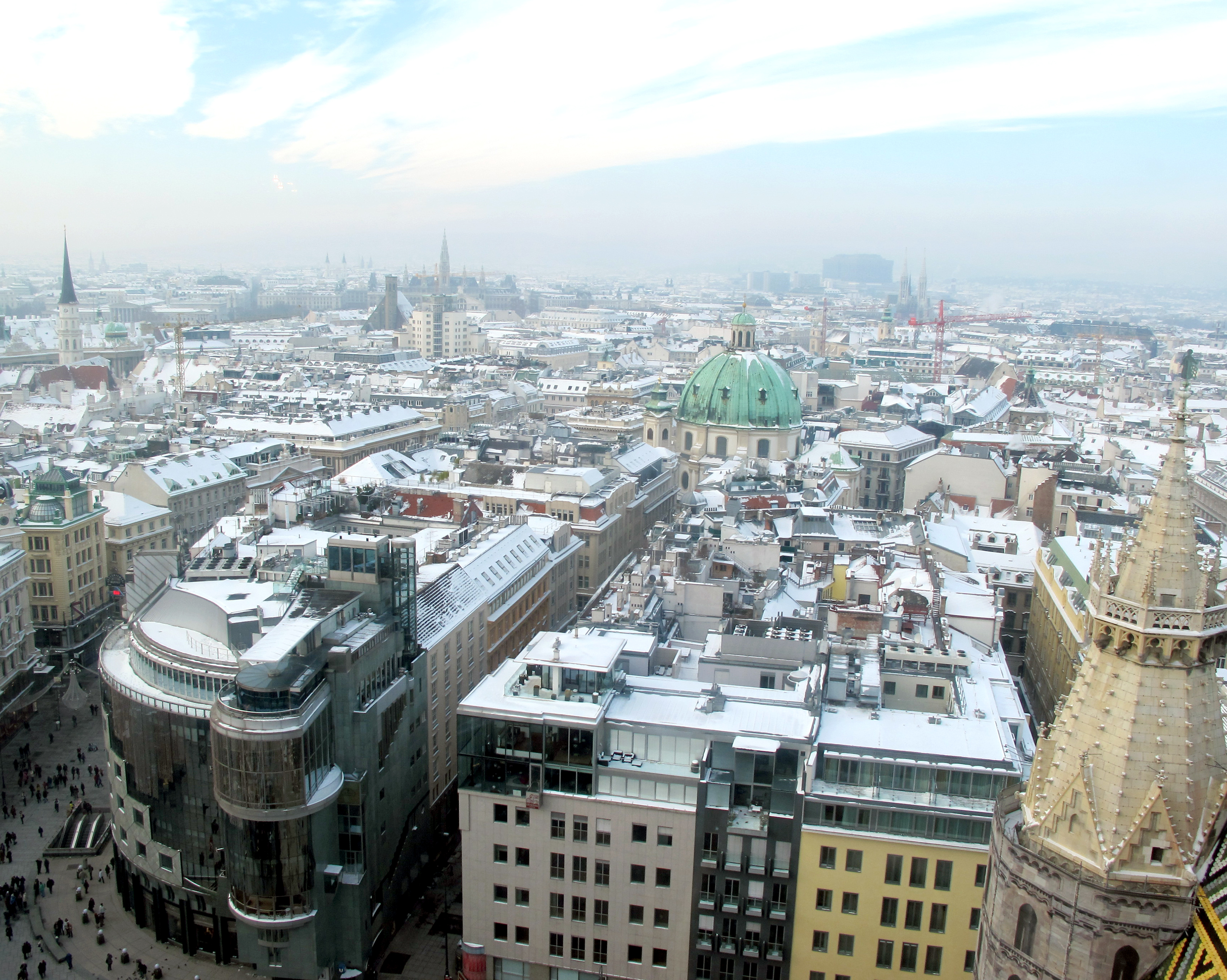
Vienna in Austria ranked the most livable city in the world in 2022 and 2023.

Livability or liveability is the degree to which a place is good for living. Livability refers to the concerns that are related to the long-term wellbeing of individuals and communities. It encompasses factors like neighborhood amenities, including parks, open space, walkways, grocery shops and restaurants as well as environmental quality, safety and health. It also incorporates things like cost and friendliness. These features contribute to the pleasantness and accessibility of communities. Additionally, livability considers the availability and quality of public transport, educational institutions and healthcare facilities. It also considers the overall cultural and social atmosphere of a place, including the presence of diverse recreational activities and community engagement opportunities. All these factors combined create an environment that enhances the overall quality of life for residents.

Researchers studying urban planning have increasingly embraced livability themes in recent decades. However, there is no universally accepted definition of livability, with each academic offering a little bit of variation. Various definitions result from the fact that, depending on their study specialties, different academics approach the idea of livability in different ways. According to many scholars, livability is a difficult notion to describe and quantify. This is because livability encompasses a wide range of factors such as access to amenities, safety, environmental quality and social cohesion. Additionally, the nature of livability and the differences between each urban environment make it challenging to establish a standardized measure that applies universally across diverse urban contexts.

City livability is assessed annually by the Economist Intelligence Unit (EIU) and tracked through its global livability ranking. In 2023, Vienna in Austria ranked first for the second year in a row as the most livable city.

== Background ==
The study of livability may be approached from a variety of angles, and each angle has its own goals and scientific approach. However, research about livability is just recently underway. The idea initially came into existence in the 1960s, when social indicators were being studied as part of scientific research on quality of life. The term "livability" was first used to describe the 1980s-era increase in interest in the study of urban quality of life. Depending on how it is interpreted in the context of the neighborhood, livability can be defined according to a number of different guiding principles.

=== Differences with the quality of life ===
The term quality of life is also used by politicians and economists to measure the livability of a given city or nation. Two widely known measures of livability are the Economist Intelligence Unit's Where-to-be-born Index and Mercer's Quality of Living Reports. These two measures calculate the livability of countries and cities around the world, respectively, through a combination of subjective life-satisfaction surveys and objective determinants of quality of life such as divorce rates, safety, and infrastructure. Such measures relate more broadly to the population of a city, state or country, not to individual quality of life. Livability has a long history and tradition in urban design, and neighborhoods design standards such as LEED-ND are often used in an attempt to influence livability.

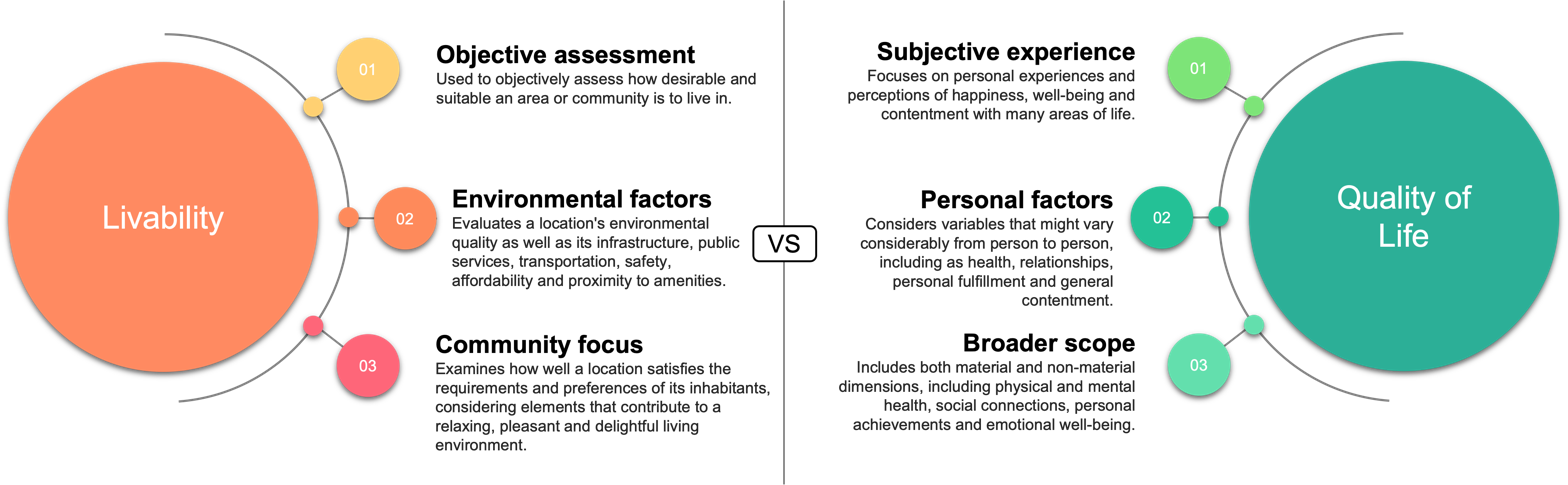
Differences between livability and quality of life.

While the quality of life relates to the individual's inspiration and physical and psychological standing in life, livability is more concerned with the individual's connection with the urban place and is one of the determinants of measuring the quality of life. Livability is an objective assessment that takes into account factors such as access to amenities, safety, transportation, and environmental quality. It focuses on how comfortable and enjoyable a city or neighborhood is to live in, whereas quality of life is more subjective and encompasses a broader range of personal factors, including health, education, income, and social relationships.

== Livability principles ==
There are several livability-related principles, some of which are established by the local government in each country, as is the case in the United States and Singapore. These principles aim to ensure that cities and communities are designed and managed in a way that promotes the well-being and quality of life for their residents. They cover various aspects such as access to healthcare, education, transportation, affordable housing, green spaces, and cultural amenities. Additionally, these principles often prioritize sustainability and environmental considerations to create more resilient and livable cities for future generations.

=== In the US ===
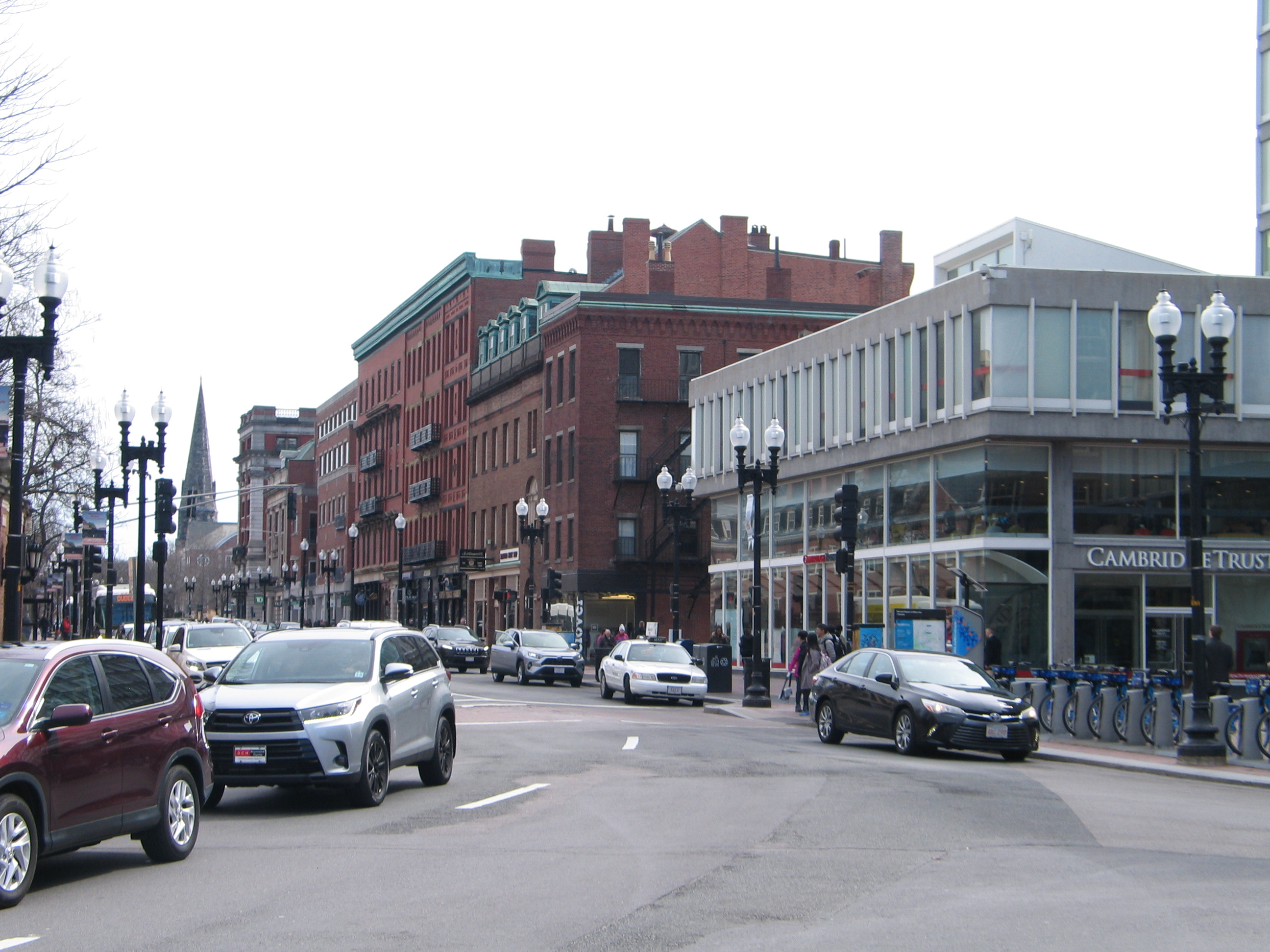
Cambridge, Massachusetts has been ranked as one of the top five livable cities in the US in 2023.

Six livability criteria that are essential for every neighborhood have been defined by the US Partnership for Sustainable Communities . They are as follows:

- Deliver additional transportation options. Create safe, dependable and cost-effective transportation options to lower household transportation expenses, decrease energy use and reliance on foreign oil, improve air quality, lower greenhouse gas emissions and advance public health.
- Encourage equitable affordable housing. To improve mobility and reduce the cost of housing and transportation combined, increase the options for location and energy-efficient housing for people of all ages, income levels, races and ethnicities.
- Boost economic competitiveness. Increase economic competitiveness by providing workers with dependable and prompt access to places of employment, opportunities for education, services and other necessities, as well as by expanding business access to markets.
- Support existing communities. To boost community revitalization, improve the effectiveness of public works investments, and protect rural landscapes, direct federal funding toward already existing communities using strategies like transit-oriented, mixed-use development and land recycling.
- Manage and leverage federal policies and investments. Align federal funding and policies to increase accountability and efficiency at all levels of government, remove obstacles to collaboration and promote the use of locally produced renewable energy as a source of energy. This will help the country prepare for future growth.
- Value communities and neighborhoods. Investing in wholesome, secure, and walkable neighborhoods—whether rural, urban, or suburban—will help to enhance the distinctive qualities of all communities.

=== In Singapore ===
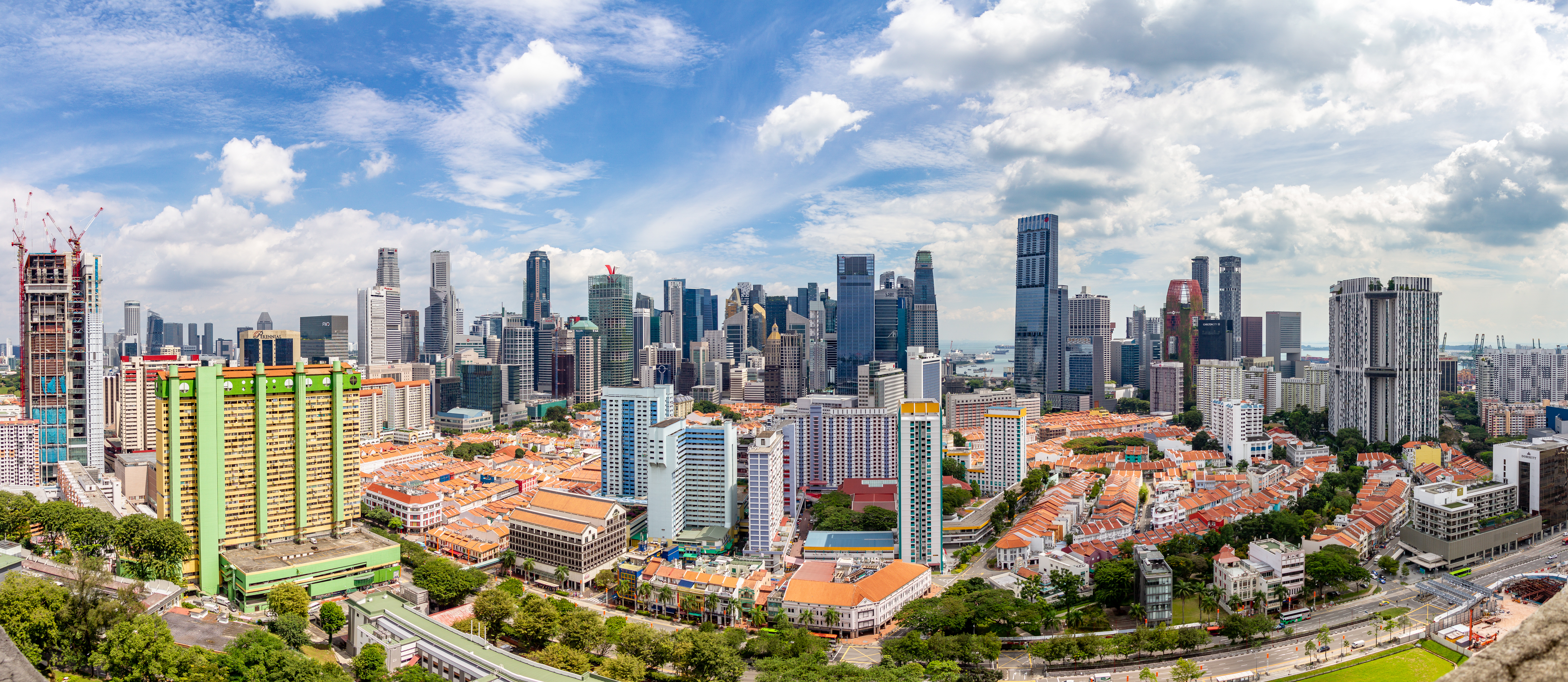
Singapore has been chosen as the most livable city for East Asian expatriates in 2022.

Singapore developed ten livability principles for dense cities during a workshop hosted by the Urban Land Institute and Centre for Livable Cities in 2012. About sixty-two leaders, specialists and practitioners from many fields of urban planning and development attended the workshop, where they provided the following guidelines.

- Principle 1 - Plan for long-term growth and renewal: Striving for long-term urban renewal and expansion. Long-term planning, responsive land policy, development control and smart design are all combined to achieve these goals.
- Principle 2 - Embrace diversity and foster inclusiveness: Promote inclusivity and variety in order to improve social interaction.
- Principle 3 - Draw nature closer to people: Bring nature closer to the public sphere by giving the city green space to unwind from the daily clamor of urban existence, which will reduce solar heat gain and improve air quality.
- Principle 4 - Develop affordable mixed-use neighborhoods: The construction of inexpensive, conveniently located, compact, self-sufficient, and cost-effective mixed-use neighborhoods that share facilities.
- Principle 5 - Make public spaces work harder: To make the most of every square foot of land, infrastructure should be installed in all public spaces to serve a variety of purposes.
- Principle 6 - Prioritize green transport and building options: Offer other transportation options by creating an effective and linked public transport system and prioritize green building and transportation options.
- Principle 7- Relieve density with variety and add green boundaries: By mixing high-rise and low-rise structures, you may create a skyline that is more dynamic and lessens the feeling of being crowded. This will lessen density and add green borders.
- Principle 8 - Activate spaces for greater safety: Enhancing "visual access" to locations would enable the community to act as a collective set of "eyes on the street," hence enhancing safety in neighborhoods.
- Principle 9 - Promote innovative and nonconventional solutions: Encourage unconventional and new approaches by considering non-traditional ways to overcome difficulties.
- Principle 10 - Forge 3P partnerships: Combining "3P" (people, public, and private) partnerships allows the municipal administration and other stakeholders to certify that no actions are being taken that might have a detrimental impact on the quality of life for others.

== Livability in mixed-use developments ==
Facilities that serve the local population as well as an adequate quantity of mixed uses in an acceptable allocation and ratio all contribute to the mixed-use area's increased livability. These facilities include ones for education, entertainment, shopping, and health and medical care. An essential component of livability is the accessibility of those facilities. Similarly, as they have a significant positive impact on society, the environment and the economy, the neighborhood must have a sufficient number of public open spaces and other recreational facilities. Public parks, plazas and other open areas are crucial because they aid in easing the crowded feeling that mixed-use communities frequently experience.

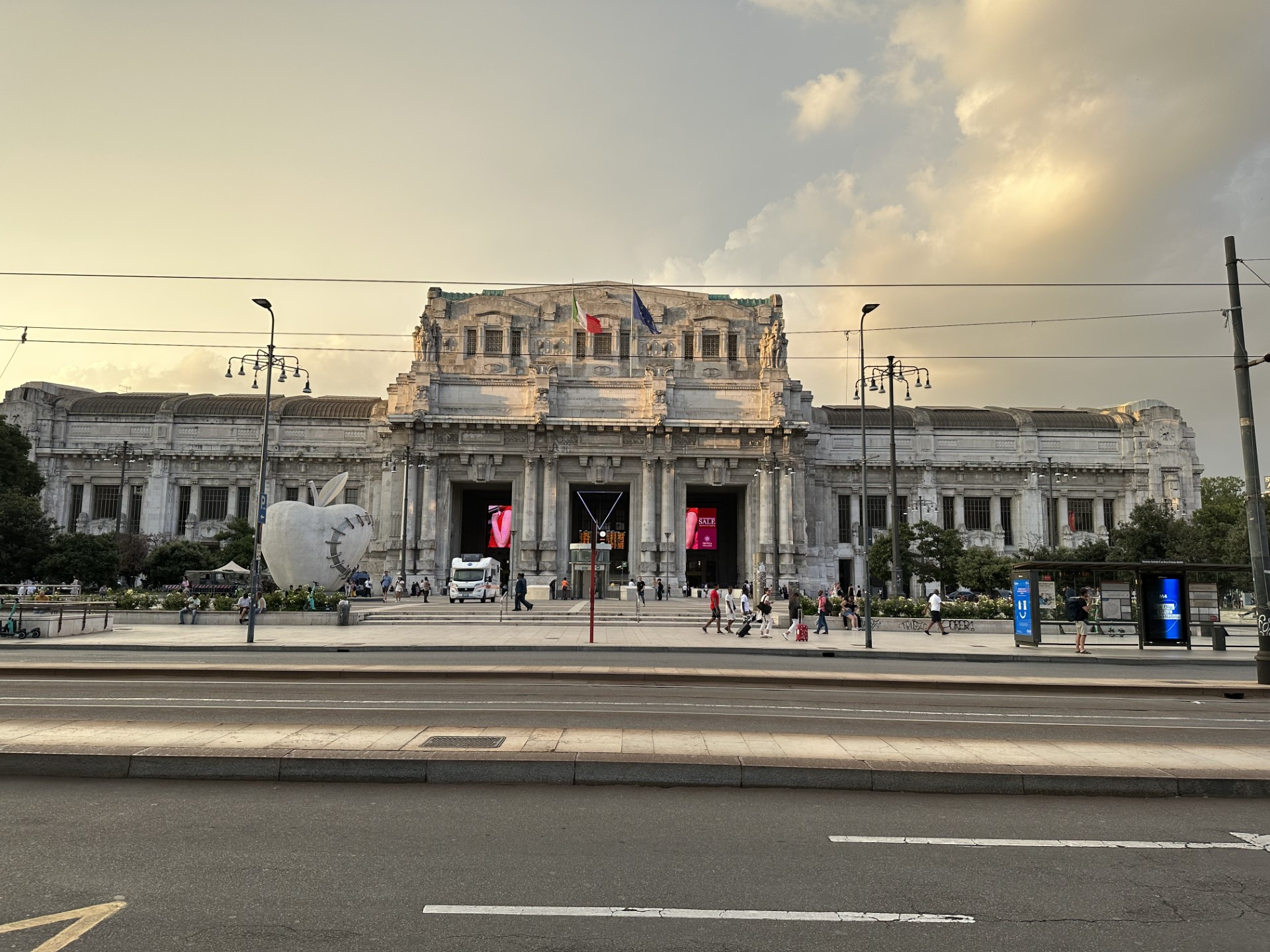
Milano Central Station is an example of a transport hub in a metropolitan city. Having well-connected public transport is one of the parameters used to assess the livability of a city.

Many of the studies emphasized the beneficial impacts of green spaces on people's health and overall well-being. People are more likely to encounter each other when these open spaces are present, especially in communities with a variety of uses and a high population density. These social connections might strengthen the neighborhood's sense of belonging. Others contend; however, that because of overcrowding and the bad associations that go along with it, individuals prefer to retreat from social interaction in high-density neighborhoods, causing each social group to be confined within itself.

Giving individuals more opportunities to walk around their neighborhoods would boost the sense of security since more people will feel like they are being watched on the streets. However, other academics argue that as the number of residents and workers in a community increases, a sense of anonymity would develop, which might raise crime rates. Overall, community management plans and upkeep are frequently associated with a perceived sense of safety in the area.

Additionally, the housing size inside a dense urban fabric has a significant impact on how satisfied locals are with their area. Some researchers contend that this feeling of compactness can be diminished by a well thought-out design that considers the socioeconomic and cultural context of the residents and how they affect the overall neighborhood experience. While there is no set standard for dwelling size, a small dwelling size reduces the feeling of privacy and is one of the drawbacks associated with dense urban neighborhoods.

The availability of a transportation system, together with a neighborhood's with a balanced mix of uses, is considered by scholars to be one of the most crucial factors in a neighborhood's livability. Although livability principles were not taken into consideration, conventional methods of transportation design mainly focused on the need to reduce traffic congestion, allow quick automotive circulation and satisfy parking demands. So, in order to make a neighborhood more livable, there must be a variety of transportation alternatives that are available and usable by people of all ages, from all socioeconomic backgrounds and from all financial levels. Other researchers suggest that extremely congested mixed-use neighborhoods encourage the deployment of substantially better quality public transportation options.

== Challenges to livability ==
There are several challenges to livability. These challenges can be subdivided into several categories such as Urbanization and population growth, income distribution and affordability issues, environmental sustainability and climate challenge and urban planning and infrastructure development.

=== Urbanization and population growth ===
Urbanization and population growth pose challenges to livability as cities become overcrowded, leading to increased traffic congestion, inadequate housing and strain on resources such as water and energy. Furthermore, rapid urbanization and population growth often result in the loss of green spaces and biodiversity, further compromising the quality of life in cities. Additionally, these challenges can exacerbate social inequalities and create a lack of access to essential services and amenities for certain populations within urban areas.

=== Income distribution and affordability issues ===
Income inequality and affordability issues further impact livability, as lower-income individuals struggle to access affordable housing, healthcare and education, widening the gap between socioeconomic classes. Some cities still lack good quality affordable housing. This is forcing many families to make difficult trade-offs between housing quality, space, and neighborhood amenities. In Bangkok, for example, many residents must make lengthy commutes from the suburbs into the city for work due to a lack of affordable housing in the urban core. Many people reside in deteriorated dwellings, which lacks amenities like running water, heating and cooling, and sanitary facilities and is particularly susceptible to flooding.

=== Environmental sustainability and climate change ===
Environmental sustainability and climate challenges threaten livability by causing pollution, extreme weather events and the degradation of natural resources. One of the biggest challenges is figuring out how to lessen traffic and create effective transportation systems that can accommodate an expanding urban population. Additionally, circumstances brought on by local patterns of land use, transportation, and energy consumption in addition to global environmental change. These conditions affect the abilities of cities to maintain their infrastructures, provide a reliable supply of services, and support the lives and livelihoods of people.

=== Urban planning and infrastructure development ===
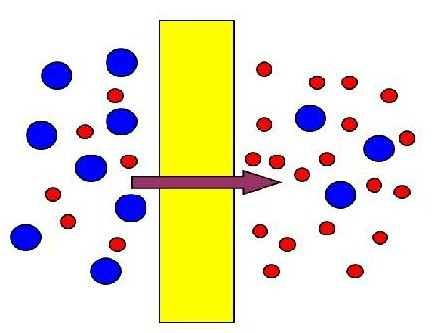
Membrane diagram resembling high traffic street

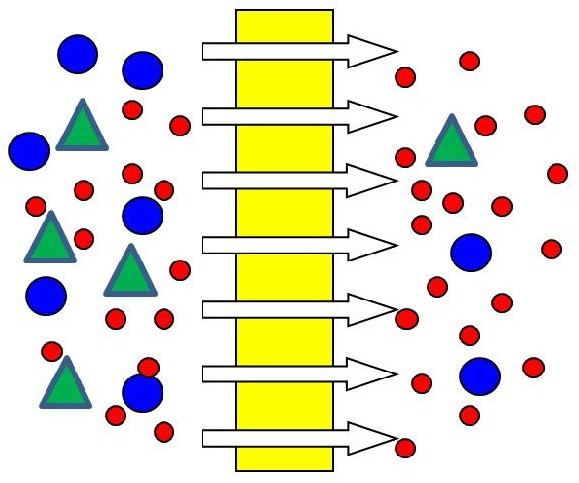
Membrane diagram resembling low traffic street

Urban planning and infrastructure development play an important role in laying the foundation for livable cities. Investments in critical services like schools, particularly for people living in rural areas who lack access to high-quality educational institutions, parks, and other necessities for an active daily lifestyle. These assets, collectively referred to as "social infrastructure," are essential for fostering neighborhood social networks and encouraging local living. For instance, residents who live in an area with a variety of social infrastructure can take care of their daily needs close by, walk to the store and interact with their neighbors. Residents' opportunities to be active and interact with friends are reduced when they must travel outside of their neighborhood to meet these needs in the absence of a diverse social infrastructure close to home.

== Improving livability ==
Recent studies on the topic of livability have pointed out some common trends that cities have adopted to improve livability in the long term. This improvement can be achieved through:

=== Technology and smart cities ===
Technology and smart cities play a crucial role in creating livable cities. By integrating technology into urban planning and development, cities can improve efficiency, sustainability and quality of life for their residents. This includes implementing smart grids to manage energy consumption, using sensors and data analytics to monitor and address environmental issues, and providing digital platforms for citizen engagement and participation. Additionally, smart cities leverage technology to enhance mobility through intelligent transportation systems, such as smart traffic management and real-time public transportation updates.

=== Integration of nature and green spaces ===
Integration of nature and green spaces is another key aspect of smart cities. By incorporating parks, gardens, and green infrastructure into urban planning, smart cities prioritize the well-being of residents and promote a healthier environment. These green spaces not only provide recreational areas for residents but also help improve air quality, reduce the heat island effect and support biodiversity. Overall, the integration of nature into smart cities creates a more sustainable and enjoyable living environment for their inhabitants.

=== Remote work and its impact on livability ===
Remote work has also had a significant impact on the livability of smart cities. With the ability to work from anywhere, residents have more flexibility in choosing where they want to live. This has led to a decentralization of urban areas, reducing traffic congestion and improving the quality of life for residents by allowing them to escape crowded city centers. Additionally, remote work has also fostered a stronger sense of community as people have more time to engage in local activities and connect with their neighbors.

=== Changing demographics and evolving needs ===
Changing demographics and evolving needs have also influenced the development of smart cities. As the population ages, there is a growing demand for age-friendly infrastructure and services, such as accessible transportation and healthcare facilities. Moreover, the increasing focus on sustainability and environmental conservation has prompted smart cities to prioritize renewable energy sources and implement eco-friendly practices to reduce their carbon footprint.

== See also ==
- Quality of life
- Transit oriented development
- Mixed-use development
- Urban planning
- Sustainable development
- Community development
