= DPZ =

DPZ may refer to:

- Dead Prez, an American hip hop group
- discontinuous permafrost zone, see Permafrost
- the stock ticker symbol for Domino's Pizza, a multinational pizza chain
- Duany Plater Zyberk & Company, an American architectural firm
- trainset hauled by SBB Re 450, a Swiss railway locomotive
