= Traditional Neighborhood Development =

Town planning paradigm

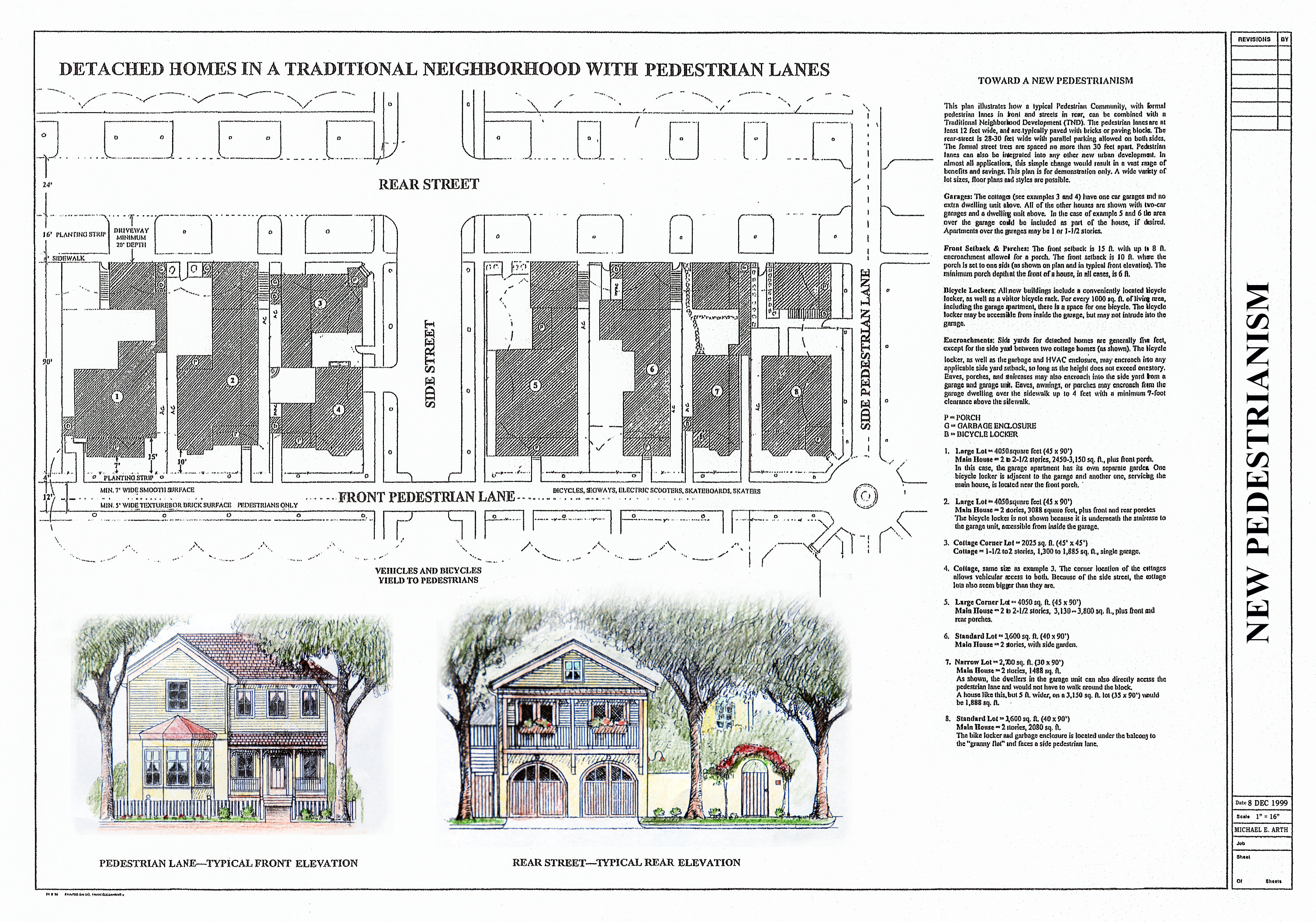
An example of a planned community drawing

Traditional Neighborhood Development (TND) refers to the development of a complete neighborhood or town using traditional town planning principles. TND may occur in infill settings and involve adaptive reuse of existing buildings, but often involves all-new construction on previously undeveloped land.

To qualify as a TND, a project should include a range of housing types, a network of well-connected streets and blocks, humane public spaces, and have amenities such as stores, schools, and places of worship within walking distance of residences. TND is focused on design details at the scale of neighborhood or town, and comprises one aspect of the larger field of New Urbanism, which encompasses all scales of planning and development, from building to region. TND projects incorporate many different architectural styles and are not exclusively traditional in aesthetic. An example of a TND known for modern style as opposed to neotraditional style is Prospect New Town. An example of neotraditional style is Baxter Village near Fort Mill, South Carolina.

== History ==
The TND type of development plan, while well known in design circles for quite some time, was originated in the US in a legal form in 1990 thru 1992 in the town of Bedford, New Hampshire. Recognizing that for the design to be implemented zoning laws needed to adapt, an effort was initiated by a group of four individuals (Rick Chellman, (now "TND" Engineering), Norman Stahl (US Federal Court of Appeals); Andrés Duany and Scott Brooks) who came together to write and then seek the passage of the first "TND Ordinance". This ordinance put into a traditional zoning form the necessary legalities that prior to its enactment made it legally impossible to gain regulatory approvals in much of the US, as the common zoning laws of the period had requirements that mandated suburban design principles directly contrary to the TND design needs. Most importantly was the adaptation away from a single 35 miles per hour (56 km/h) design speed on all suburban streets as had been the standard since the 1960s. The TND zoning was ultimately passed in Bedford, and subsequently copied and/or used as a starting point by many communities thereafter. Creating a regulatory precedent and practical foothold was the original intent of the four-person team. No TND was ever actively undertaken in the originating town of Bedford (although one was approved by the efforts of Stahl, Brooks, Chellman & Duany and it encompassed over 1,000,000 s/f of commercial space, 829 housing units and acres of riverfront park lands), as in the midst of the TND zoning approvals, a banking crisis took hold and defeated the feasibility for new development at that time.
