= Local Government Commission (Sacramento, California) =

Nonprofit organization

The Local Government Commission (LGC) is a non-profit organization in Sacramento, California dedicated to local environmental sustainability, economic prosperity and social equity. LCG has worked for over 35 years to support local policymakers on topics involving climate change, energy, water and community design. The LGC approach includes connecting leaders, advancing policies and implementing solutions. They do this through the creation of programs to connect local leaders and work on policy advancement by providing technical assistance and advice to local jurisdictions. Some of the specific services provided by the LGC including forums, workshops, training programs, presentations, design charrettes, and community image surveys. The LCG is led by a board of fifteen elected California city and county elected officials and the total membership of the nonprofit encompasses over seven hundred local leaders from around the California and the greater U.S.

== Ahwahnee Principles ==
In 1991, the LGC helped bring together the architects Peter Calthorpe, Michael Corbett, Andrés Duany, Elizabeth Moule, Elizabeth Plater-Zyberk, Stefanos Polyzoides and Daniel Solomon to develop a set of community principles for land use planning. Called the Ahwahnee Principles (after Yosemite National Park's Ahwanee Lodge). The Ahwahnee Principles were designed to help revitalize existing parts of communities through infill development and create communities that are complete and integrate a mix of uses. These principles, are a blueprint for elected officials and planners to provide compact, mixed use, walkable and transit-oriented development in their communities. The Ahwahnee Principles were the start of the now widespread and diverse SmartGrowth and New Urbanism movement This movement largely arose out of the looming presence of urban sprawl and land consumption that saw exponential expansion since the 1950s. According to the LCG, the ten principles of smart growth are 1) Preservation of open space 2) Development towards existing communities 3) Compact building design 4) Mix land uses 5) Range of housing choices 6) Variety of transportation choices 7) Walkable neighborhoods 8) Strong sense of place 9) Community and stakeholder collaboration 10) Predictable development decision

== Civic Spark ==
The LCG in partnership with the Governor's Office of Planning and Research started CivicSpark; an AmeriCorps program that hires fellows each year to implement targeting projects dedicated to helping build capacity for local governments to address environmental issues in California like climate change and water resource management. Civic Spark is administered by CaliforniaVolunteers and sponsored by the Corporation for National and Community Service.
