= Mississippi Renewal Forum =

The Mississippi Renewal Forum was a design charrette in which over 200 community leaders and design professionals worked together to plan the rebuilding of the Mississippi Coast post-Hurricane Katrina. In the course of a week in October 2005, the charrette’s design teams generated new plans and codes for all eleven municipalities along the Mississippi coast, including Waveland, Bay St. Louis, Pass Christian, Long Beach, Gulfport, Biloxi, D’Iberville, Ocean Springs, Gautier, Pascagoula and Moss Point.

The Mississippi Renewal Forum was organized by Mississippi Governor Haley Barbour’s Commission on Recovery, Rebuilding and Renewal, in coordination with the Congress for the New Urbanism and Duany Plater-Zyberk & Company. Participants included 140 architects and planners from across the country, as well as more than 50 local planners and officials.

The week-long charrette – considered by some to be the largest architectural brainstorm in 100 years – saw local and national architects worked together in teams to coordinate specific design plans for each municipality, as well as regional plans for transportation, coding and retail. Designers aimed to plan areas which would be more diverse, less auto-dependent, more environmentally-efficient and more secure from hurricanes. Accordingly, the projects not only focused on reconstruction plans, but also on zoning and development codes.

Journalists from across the country attended the event, and the forum received coverage by The New York Times, USA Today, and The Chicago Tribune, amongst other local and national periodicals.
