= New Urbanism =

Urban design movement promoting sustainable land use

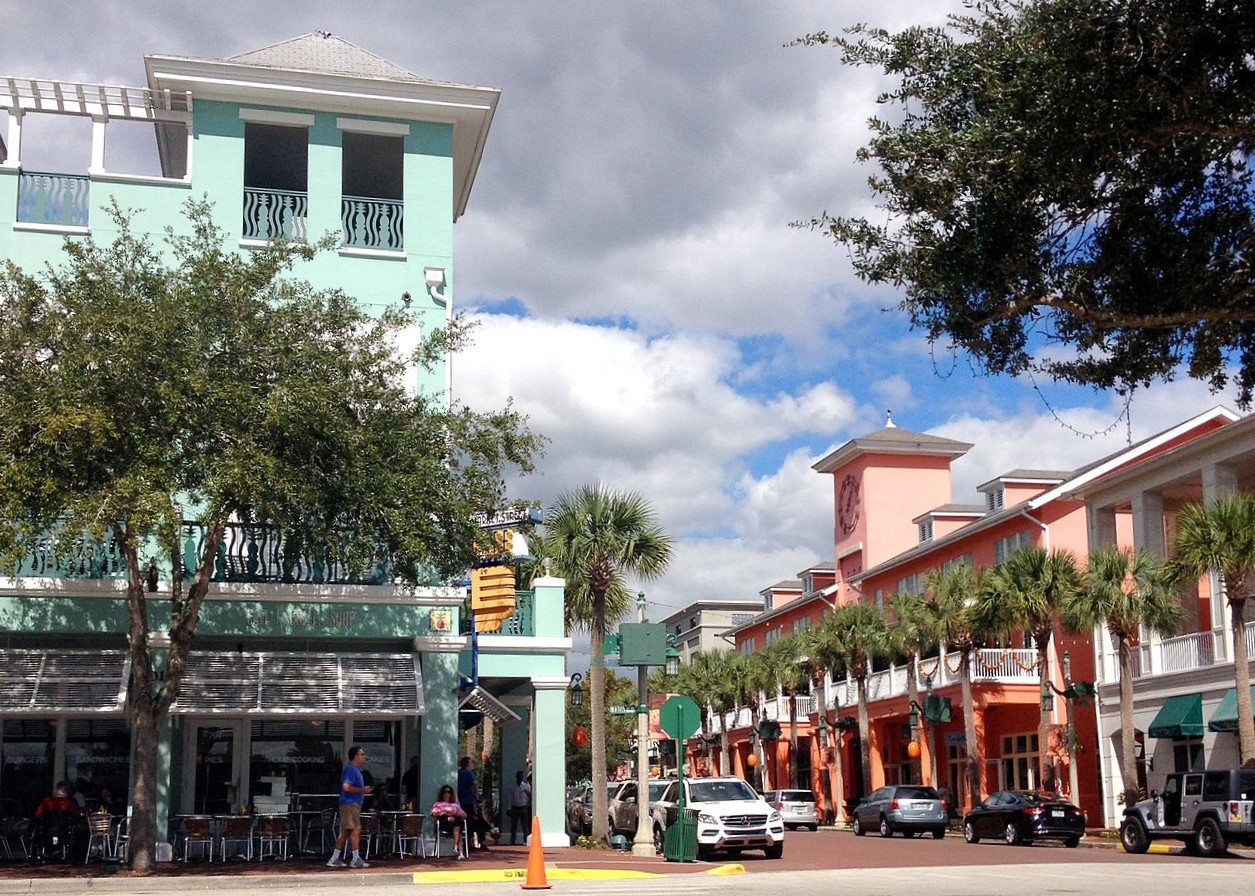
Market Street, Celebration, Florida

New Urbanism is an urban design movement that promotes environmentally friendly habits by creating walkable neighbourhoods containing a wide range of housing and job types. It arose in the United States in the early 1980s, and has gradually influenced many aspects of real estate development, urban planning, and municipal land-use strategies. New Urbanism attempts to address the ills associated with urban sprawl and post-WWII suburban development.

New Urbanism is strongly influenced by urban design practices that were prominent until the rise of the automobile prior to World War II; it encompasses basic principles such as traditional neighborhood development (TND) and transit-oriented development (TOD). These concrete principles emerge from two organizing concepts or goals: building a sense of community and the development of ecological practices.

New Urbanists support regional planning for open space; context-appropriate architecture and planning; adequate provision of infrastructure such as sporting facilities, libraries and community centres; and the balanced development of jobs and housing. They believe their strategies can reduce traffic congestion by encouraging the population to ride bikes, walk, or take the train. They also hope to increase the supply of affordable housing and rein in suburban sprawl. The Charter of the New Urbanism also covers issues such as historic preservation, safe streets, green building, and the redevelopment of brownfield land. The ten Principles of Intelligent Urbanism also phrase guidelines for New Urbanist approaches.

Architecturally, New Urbanist developments are often accompanied by New Classical, Contemporary traditional, postmodern, or vernacular styles, although that is not always the case.

== Background ==
New Urbanism began to solidify in the 1970s and 80s with the urban visions and theoretical models for the reconstruction of the "European" city proposed by architect Léon Krier, and the pattern language theories of Christopher Alexander. The term "new urbanism" itself started being used in this context in the mid-1980s, but it wasn't until the early 1990s that it was commonly written as a proper noun capitalized.

In 1991, the Local Government Commission, a private nonprofit group in Sacramento, California, invited architects Peter Calthorpe, Michael Corbett, Andrés Duany, Elizabeth Moule, Elizabeth Plater-Zyberk, Stefanos Polyzoides, and Daniel Solomon to develop a set of community principles for land use planning. Named the Ahwahnee Principles (after Yosemite National Park's Ahwahnee Hotel), the commission presented the principles to about one hundred government officials in the fall of 1991, at its first Yosemite Conference for Local Elected Officials.

In 2009, co-founders Elizabeth Moule, Hank Dittmar, and Stefanos Polyzoides authored the Canons of Sustainable Architecture and Urbanism to clarify and detail the relationship between New Urbanism and sustainability. The Canons are "a set of operating principles for human settlement that reestablish the relationship between the art of building, the making of community, and the conservation of our natural world". They promote the use of passive heating and cooling solutions, the use of locally obtained materials, and in general, a "culture of permanence".

== Defining elements ==
Andrés Duany and Elizabeth Plater-Zyberk, two of the founders of the Congress for the New Urbanism, observed mixed-use streetscapes with corner shops, front porches, and a diversity of well-crafted housing while living in one of the Victorian neighborhoods of New Haven, Connecticut. They and their colleagues observed patterns including the following:

- The neighborhood has a discernible center. This is often a square or a green and sometimes a busy or memorable street corner. A transit stop would be located at this center.
- Most of the dwellings are within a five-minute walk of the center, an average of roughly 0.25 miles (0.40 km).
- There are a variety of dwelling types — usually houses, rowhouses, and apartments — so that younger and older people, singles and families, the poor and the wealthy may find places to live.
- At the edge of the neighborhood, there are shops and offices of sufficiently varied types to supply the weekly needs of a household.
- A small ancillary building or garage apartment is permitted within the backyard of each house. It may be used as a rental unit or place to work (for example, an office or craft workshop).
- An elementary school is close enough so that most children can walk from their home.
- There are small playgrounds accessible to every dwelling — not more than a tenth of a mile away.
- Streets within the neighborhood form a connected network, which disperses traffic by providing a variety of pedestrian and vehicular routes to any destination.
- The streets are relatively narrow and shaded by rows of trees. This slows traffic, creating an environment suitable for pedestrians and bicycles.
- Buildings in the neighborhood center are placed close to the street, creating a well-defined outdoor room.
- Parking lots and garage doors rarely front the street. Parking is relegated to the rear of buildings, usually accessed by alleys.
- Certain prominent sites at the termination of street vistas or in the neighborhood center are reserved for civic buildings. These provide sites for community meetings, education, and religious or cultural activities.

== Terminology ==
Several terms are viewed either as synonymous, included in, or overlapping with the New Urbanism. The terms Neotraditional Development or Traditional Neighborhood Development are often associated with the New Urbanism. These terms generally refer to complete New Towns or new neighborhoods, often built in traditional architectural styles, as opposed to smaller infill and redevelopment projects. The term Traditional Urbanism has also been used to describe the New Urbanism by those who object to the "new" moniker. The term "Walkable Urbanism" was proposed as an alternative term by developer and professor Christopher Leinberger. Many debate whether Smart Growth and the New Urbanism are the same or whether substantive differences exist between the two; overlap exists in membership and content between the two movements. Placemaking is another term that is often used to signify New Urbanist efforts or those of like-minded groups. The term Transit-Oriented Development is sometimes cited as being coined by prominent New Urbanist Peter Calthorpe and is heavily promoted by New Urbanists. The term sustainable development is sometimes associated with the New Urbanism as there has been an increasing focus on the environmental benefits of New Urbanism associated with the rise of the term sustainability in the 2000s, however, this has caused some confusion as the term is also used by the United Nations and Agenda 21 to include human development issues (e.g., developing country) that exceed the scope of land development intended to be addressed by the New Urbanism or Sustainable Urbanism. The term "livability" or "livable communities" was popular under the Obama administration, though it dates back at least to the mid-1990s when the term was used by the Local Government Commission.

Planning magazine discussed the proliferation of "urbanisms" in an article in 2011 titled "A Short Guide to 60 of the Newest Urbanisms". Several New Urbanists have popularized terminology under the umbrella of the New Urbanism including Sustainable Urbanism and Tactical Urbanism (of which Guerrilla Urbanism can be viewed as a subset). The term Tactical Urbanism was coined by Frenchman Michel de Certau in 1968 and revived in 2011 by New Urbanist Mike Lydon and the co-authors of the Tactical Urbanism Guide. In 2011 Andres Duany authored a book that used the term Agrarian Urbanism to describe an agriculturally-focused subset of New Urbanist town design. In 2013 a group of New Urbanists led by CNU co-founder Andres Duany began a research project under the banner of Lean Urbanism which purported to provide a bridge between Tactical Urbanism and the New Urbanism.

Other terms have surfaced in reaction to the New Urbanism intended to provide a contrast, alternative to, or a refinement of the New Urbanism. Some of these terms include Everyday Urbanism by Harvard Professor Margaret Crawford, John Chase, and John Kaliski, Ecological Urbanism, and True Urbanism by architect Bernard Zyscovich. Landscape urbanism was popularized by Charles Waldheim who explicitly defined it as in opposition to the New Urbanism in his lectures at Harvard University. Landscape Urbanism and its Discontents, edited by Andres Duany and Emily Talen, specifically addressed the tension between these two views of urbanism.

== Organizations ==
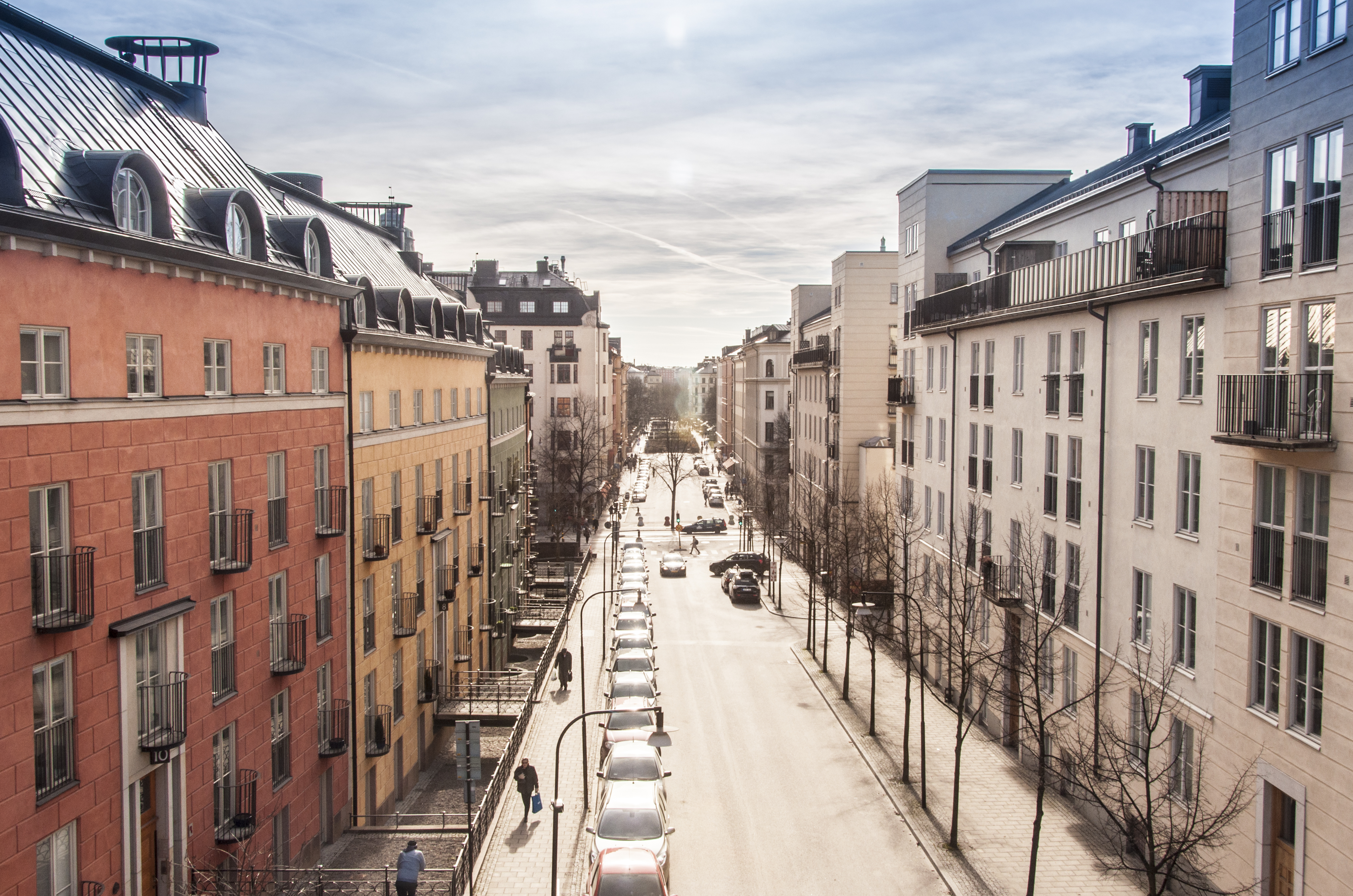
New urbanist Sankt Eriksområdet quarter in Stockholm, Sweden, built in the 1990s.

In the U.S., the Congress for the New Urbanism (CNU) is the leading organization promoting walkable, mixed-use neighborhood development, sustainable communities, and healthier living conditions. Founded in 1993, the CNU advances the principles of its Charter, including compact blocks, diverse housing options, pedestrian and transit accessibility, and human-scaled public spaces.

While the CNU operates primarily in North America with regional chapters and student groups (such as Students for the New Urbanism and the Next Generation of New Urbanists), sister organizations and allied groups promote New Urbanist principles globally. These include the Council for European Urbanism (CEU) in Europe, INTBAU, the Movement for Israeli Urbanism (MIU), and the Australian Council for the New Urbanism.

In the United Kingdom, traditional urbanism principles are championed by organizations like The Prince's Foundation for the Built Environment and Create Streets, as well as supported by policy frameworks such as the Living with Beauty report.

The CNU also collaborates widely under the Smart Growth banner, partnering with groups like the United States Green Building Council and the Natural Resources Defense Council to create standards such as LEED for Neighborhood Development. Other prominent institutions supporting the movement include the Seaside Institute in Seaside, Florida, which has awarded the annual Seaside Prize since 1993.

== Criticism ==
New Urbanism has drawn both praise and criticism from all parts of the political spectrum. It has been criticized both for being a social engineering scheme and for failing to address social equity and for both restricting private enterprise and for being a deregulatory force in support of private sector developers.

Journalist Alex Marshall has decried New Urbanism as essentially a marketing scheme that repackages conventional suburban sprawl behind a façade of nostalgic imagery and empty, aspirational slogans. In a 1996 article in Metropolis magazine, Marshall denounced New Urbanism as "a grand fraud". The attack continued in numerous articles, including an opinion column in The Washington Post in September of the same year, and in Marshall's first book, How Cities Work: Suburbs, Sprawl, and the Roads Not Taken.

Critics have asserted that the effectiveness claimed for the New Urbanist solution of mixed income developments lacks statistical evidence. Independent studies have supported the idea of addressing poverty through mixed-income developments, but the argument that New Urbanism produces such diversity has been challenged from findings from one community in Canada.

Some parties have criticized the New Urbanism for being too accommodating of motor vehicles and not going far enough to promote cleaner modes of travelling such as walking, cycling, and public transport. The Charter of the New Urbanism states that "communities should be designed for the pedestrian and transit as well as the car". Some critics suggest that communities should exclude the car altogether in favor of car-free developments. Steve Melia proposes the idea of "filtered permeability" (see Permeability (spatial and transport planning)) which increases the connectivity of the pedestrian and cycling network resulting in a time and convenience advantage over drivers while still limiting the connectivity of the vehicular network and thus maintaining the safety benefits of cul de sacs and horseshoe loops in resistance to property crime.

In response to critiques of a lack of evidence for the New Urbanism's claimed environmental benefits, a rating system for neighborhood environmental design, LEED-ND, was developed by the U.S. Green Building Council, Natural Resources Defense Council, and the Congress for the New Urbanism (CNU), to quantify the sustainability of New Urbanist neighborhood design. New Urbanist and board member of CNU Doug Farr has taken a step further and coined Sustainable Urbanism, which combines New Urbanism and LEED-ND to create walkable, transit-served urbanism with high performance buildings and infrastructure.

Criticizing the lack of evidence for low greenhouse gas emissions results, Susan Subak has pointed out that while New Urbanism emphasizes walkability and building variety, it is the scale of dwellings, especially the absence of large houses that may determine successful, low carbon outcomes at the community level.

New Urbanism has been criticized for being a form of centrally planned, large-scale development, "instead of allowing the initiative for construction to be taken by the final users themselves". It has been criticized for asserting universal principles of design instead of attending to local conditions.

== Examples ==
=== United States ===
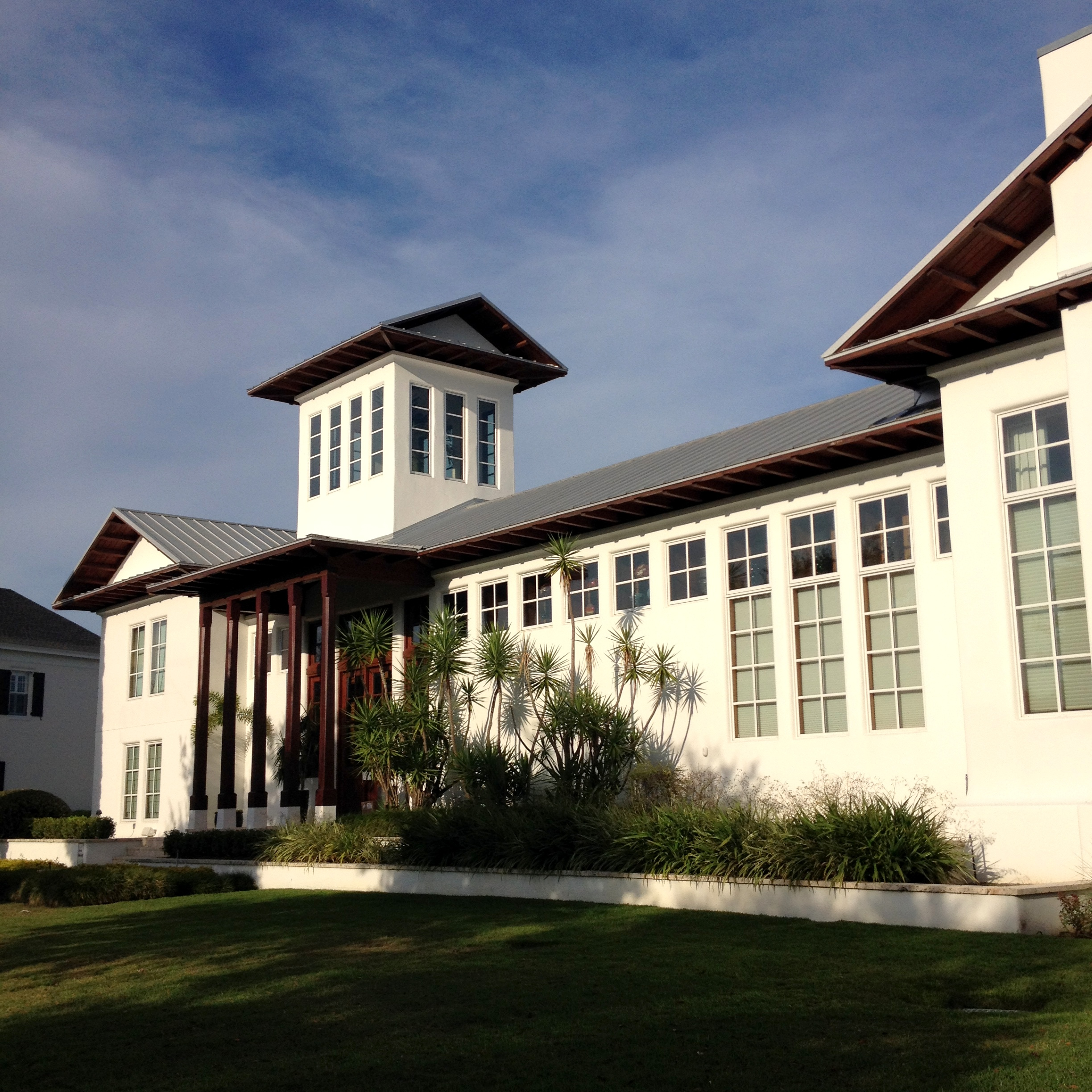
A Key West style house in Baldwin Park, Florida

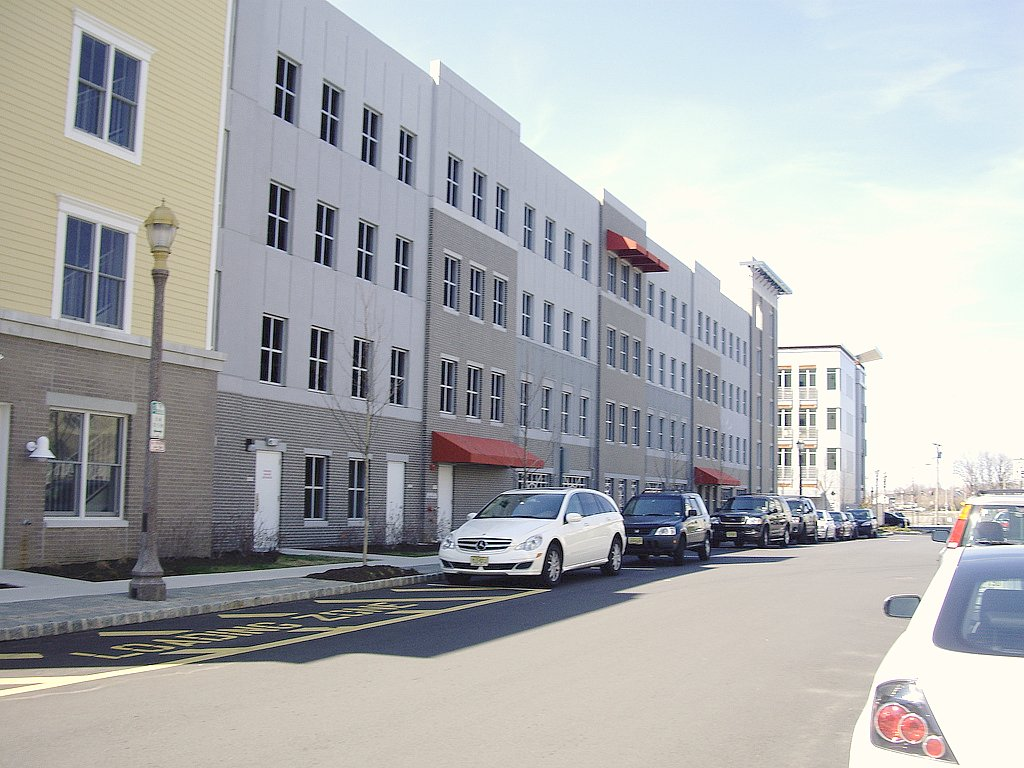
The Pier Village community in Long Branch, New Jersey in 2009

New Urbanism is having a growing influence on how and where metropolitan regions choose to grow. At least fourteen large-scale planning initiatives are based on the principles of linking transportation and land-use policies, and using the neighborhood as the fundamental building block of a region.

More than six hundred new towns, villages, and neighborhoods, following New Urbanist principles, have been planned or are currently under construction in the U.S. Hundreds of new, small-scale, urban and suburban infill projects are under way to reestablish walkable streets and blocks. In Maryland and several other states, New Urbanist principles are an integral part of smart growth legislation.

In the mid-1990s, the U.S. Department of Housing and Urban Development (HUD) adopted the principles of the New Urbanism in its multibillion-dollar program to rebuild public housing projects nationwide. New Urbanists have planned and developed hundreds of projects in infill locations. Most were driven by the private sector, but many, including HUD projects, used public money.

==== Prospect New Town ====
Founded in the mid-1990s, Prospect New Town is Colorado's first full-scale New Urbanist community. Developer Kiki Wallace worked with the firm of Duany Plater Zyberk & Company to develop the 32-acre (13 ha) neighborhood that was formerly his family's tree farm. Currently in its final phase of development, the neighborhood is intended to have a population of approximately 2,000 people in 585 units on 340 lots. The development includes a town center interwoven into the center of the residential area, with businesses ranging from restaurants to professional offices. The streets are oriented to maximize the view of the mountains, and the traditional town center is no more than five minutes on foot from any place in the neighborhood.

==== University Place in Memphis ====
In 2010, University Place in Memphis, Tennessee became the second only U.S. Green Building Council (USGBC) LEED certified neighborhood. LEED ND (neighborhood development) standards integrates principles of smart growth, urbanism, and green building and were developed through a collaboration between USGBC, Congress for the New Urbanism, and the Natural Resources Defense Council. University Place, developed by McCormack Baron Salazar, is a 405-unit, 30-acre (12 ha), mixed-income, mixed use, multigenerational, HOPE VI grant community that revitalized the severely distressed Lamar Terrace public housing site.

==== The Cotton District ====
The Cotton District in Starkville, Mississippi was the first New Urbanist development, begun in 1968 long before the New Urbanism movement was organized. The District borders Mississippi State University, and consists mostly of residential rental units for college students along with restaurants, bars and retail. The Cotton District got its name because it is built in the vicinity of an old cotton mill.

==== Seaside ====
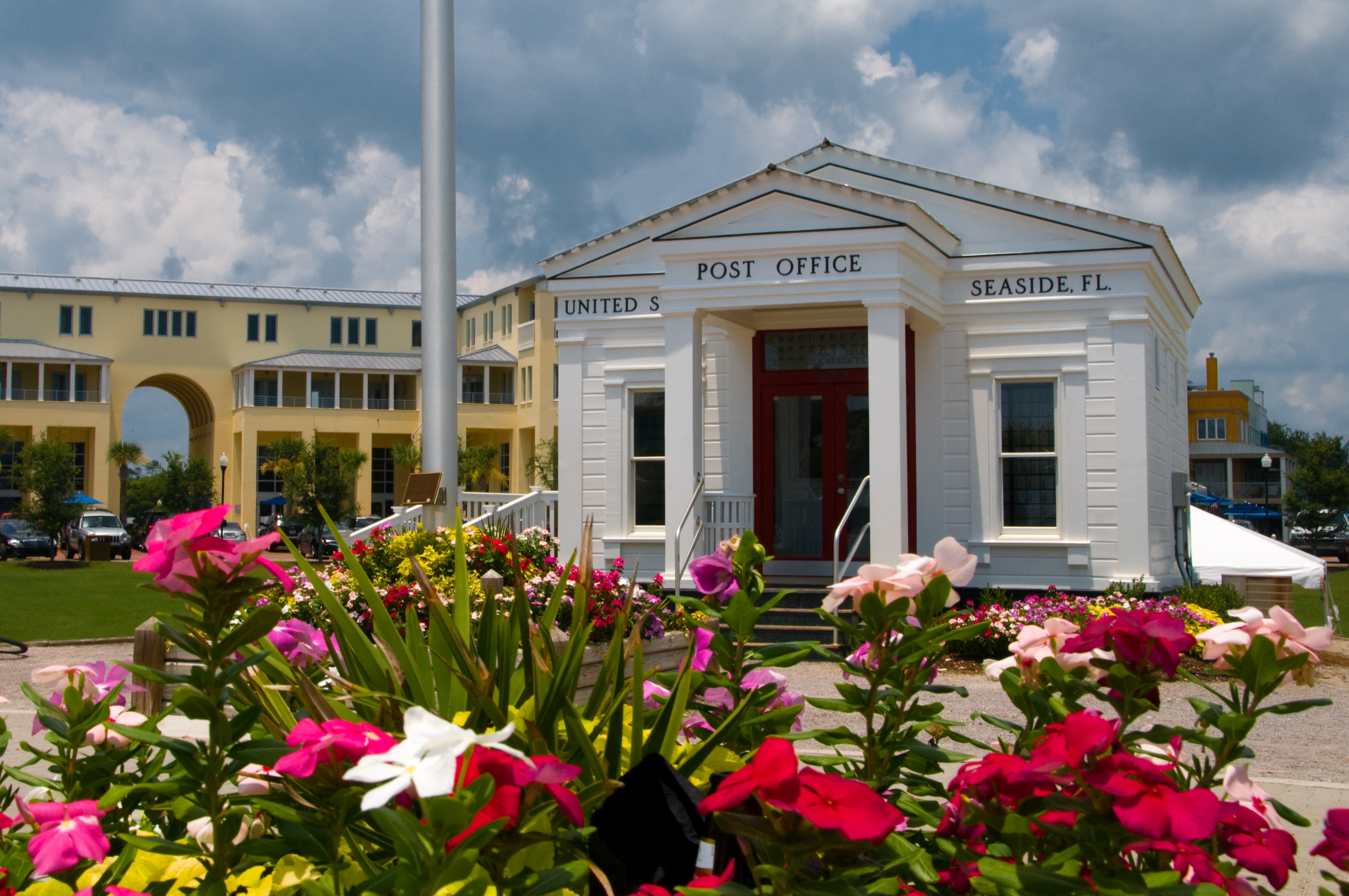
Seaside, Florida

Seaside, Florida, the first fully New Urbanist town, began development in 1981 on 80 acres (32 ha) of Florida Panhandle coastline. It was featured on the cover of the Atlantic Monthly in 1988, when only a few streets were completed, and it has become internationally famous for its architecture, as well as the quality of its streets and public spaces.

Seaside is now a tourist destination, and it appeared in the film The Truman Show (1998). Lots sold for US$15,000 in the early 1980s. Slightly over a decade later, in the mid-1990s, the price had escalated to about US$200,000. Today, most lots sell for more than $1 million, and some houses top $5 million.

==== Mueller Community ====
The Mueller Community is located on the 700-acre (280 ha) site of the former Robert Mueller Municipal Airport in Austin, Texas, which closed in 1999. Per the developer, the value of the Mueller development upon completion will be $1.3 billion, and will comprise 4.2 million square feet (390,000 m^{2}) of non-residential development, 650,000 square feet (60,000 m^{2}) of retail space, 4,600 homes, and 140 acres (57 ha) of open space. An estimated 10,000 permanent jobs within the development will have been created by the time it is complete. In 2012, the Mueller Community had more electric cars per capita than any other neighborhood in the United States – a fact partially attributable to an incentive program.

==== Stapleton ====
The site of the former Stapleton International Airport in Denver and Aurora, Colorado, closed in 1995, is now being redeveloped by Forest City Enterprises. Stapleton is expected to be home to at least 30,000 residents, six schools, and 2 million square feet (190,000 m^{2}) of retail. Construction began in 2001. Northfield Stapleton, one of the development's major retail centers, recently opened.

==== San Antonio ====
In 1997, San Antonio, Texas, as part of a new master plan, created new regulations called the Unified Development Code (UDC), largely influenced by New Urbanism. One feature of the UDC is six unique land development patterns that can be applied to certain districts: Conservation Development; Commercial Center Development; Office or Institutional Campus Development; Commercial Retrofit Development; Tradition Neighborhood Development; and Transit Oriented Development. Each district has specific standards and design regulations. The six development patterns were created to reflect existing development patterns.

==== Mountain House ====
Mountain House, one of the latest New Urbanist projects in the United States, is a new town located near Tracy, California. Construction started in 2001. Mountain House will consist of 12 villages, each with its own elementary school, park, and commercial area. In addition, a future train station, transit center, and bus system are planned for Mountain House.

==== Mesa del Sol ====
Mesa del Sol, New Mexico—the largest New Urbanist project in the United States—was designed by architect Peter Calthorpe, and is being developed by Forest City Enterprises. Mesa del Sol may take five decades to reach full build-out, at which time it should have: 38,000 residential units, housing a population of 100,000; a 1,400-acre (570 ha) industrial office park; four town centers; an urban center; and a downtown that would provide a twin city within Albuquerque.

==== I'On ====
Located in Mount Pleasant, South Carolina, I'On is a traditional neighborhood development, mixed with a new urbanism styled architecture, reflecting on the building designs of the nearby downtown areas of Charleston, South Carolina. Founded on April 30, 1995, I'On was designed by the town planning firms of Dover, Kohl & Partners and Duany Plater-Zyberk & Company, and currently holds over 750 single family homes. Features of the community include extensive sidewalks, shared public greens and parks, trails, and a grid of narrow, traffic calming streets. Most homes are required to have a front porch of not less than 8 feet (2.4 m) in depth. Floor heights of 10 feet (3.0 m), raised foundations, and smaller lot sizes give the community a dense, vertical feel.

==== Haile Plantation ====
Haile Plantation, Florida, is a 2,600-household, 1,700-acre (690 ha) development of regional impact southwest of the city of Gainesville, within Alachua County. Haile Village Center is a traditional neighborhood center within the development. It was originally started in 1978 and completed in 2007. In addition to the 2,600 homes the neighborhood consists of two merchant centers (one a New England narrow street village and the other a chain grocery strip mall), as well as two public elementary schools and an 18-hole golf course.

==== Celebration, Florida ====
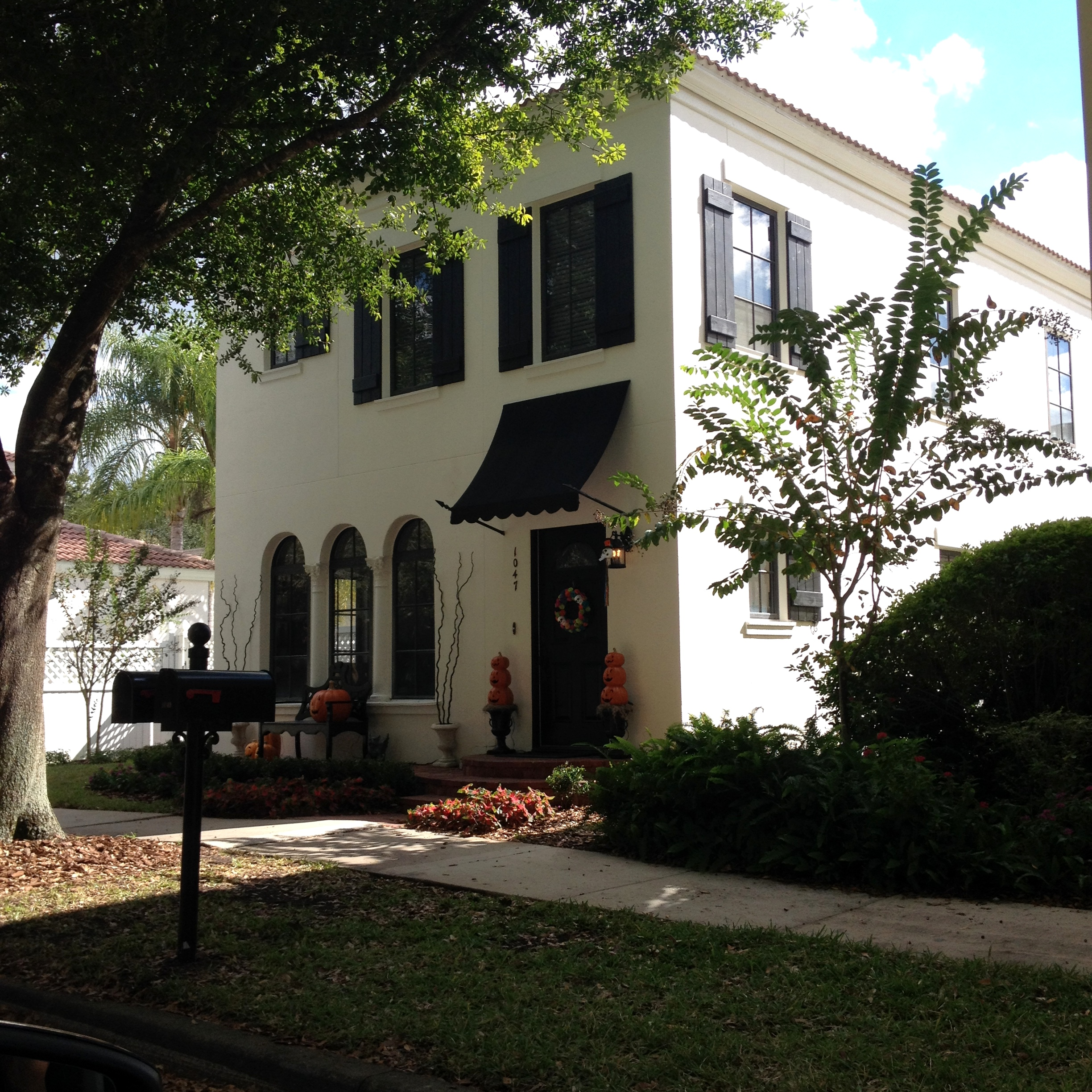
A Mediterranean Revival house in Celebration, Florida

In June 1996, the Walt Disney Company unveiled its 5,000-acre (2,000 ha) town of Celebration, near Orlando, Florida. Celebration opened its downtown in October 1996, relying heavily on the experiences of Seaside, whose downtown was nearly complete. Disney shuns the label New Urbanism, calling Celebration simply a "town".

Celebration's Downtown has become one of the area's most popular tourist destinations making the community a showcase for New Urbanism as a prime example of the creation of a "sense of place".

==== Jersey City ====
The construction of the Hudson Bergen Light Rail in Hudson County, New Jersey has spurred transit-oriented development. In Jersey City, at least three projects are planned to transform brownfield sites, two of which have required remediation of toxic waste by previous owners:

- Bayfront, once site of a Honeywell plant is a 100-acre (40 ha) site on the Hackensack River, near the planned West Campus of New Jersey City University.
- Canal Crossing, named for the former Morris Canal, was once partially owned by PPG Industries, and is a 117-acre (47 ha) site west of Liberty State Park.
- Liberty Harbor is on the north side of the Morris Canal.

==== Old York Village, Chesterfield Township, New Jersey ====
The sparsely developed agricultural Township of Chesterfield in New Jersey covers approximately 21.61 square miles (56.0 km^{2}; 5,600 ha) and has made farmland preservation a priority since the 1970s. Chesterfield has permanently preserved more than 7,000 acres (28 km^{2}; 2,800 ha) of farmland through state and county programs and a township-wide transfer of development credits program that directs future growth to a designated "receiving area" known as Old York Village. Old York Village is a neo-traditional, new urbanism town on 560 acres (2.3 km^{2}; 230 ha) incorporating a variety of housing types, neighborhood commercial facilities, a new elementary school, civic uses, and active and passive open space areas with preserved agricultural land surrounding the planned village. Construction began in the early 2000s and a significant percentage of the community is now complete. Old York Village was the winner of the American Planning Association National Outstanding Planning Award in 2004.

==== Civita ====
Civita is a sustainable, transit-oriented 230-acre (93 ha) master-planned village under development in the Mission Valley area of San Diego, California, United States. Located on a former quarry site, the urban-style village is organized around a community park that cascades down the terraced property. Civita development plans call for 70 acres (28 ha) of parks and open space, 4,780 residences (including approximately 478 affordable units), an approximately 480,000-square-foot (45,000 m^{2}) retail center, and 420,000 square feet (39,000 m^{2}) for an office/business campus.

Sudberry Properties, the developer of Civita, incorporated numerous green building practices in the Civita design. In 2009, Civita achieved a Stage 1 Gold rating for the U.S. Green Building Council's 2009 LEED-ND (Neighborhood Development) pilot and received the California Governor's Environmental and Economic Leadership Award. In 2010, Civita was designated as a California Catalyst Community by the California Department of Housing and Community Development to support innovation and test sustainable strategies that reflect the interdependence of environmental, economic, and community health.

==== Del Mar Station ====
Del Mar Station, which won a Congress for the New Urbanism Charter Award in 2003, is a transit-oriented development surrounding a prominent Metro Rail stop on the Gold Line, which connects Los Angeles and Pasadena. Located at the southern edge of downtown Pasadena, it serves as a gateway to the city with 347 apartments, out of which 15% are affordable units. Approximately 20,000 square feet (1,900 m^{2}) of retail is linked with a network of public plazas, paseos, and private courtyards. The 3.4-acre (1.4 ha), US$77 million project sits above a 1,200-car multi-level subterranean parking garage, with 600 spaces dedicated to transit. A light rail right-of-way, detailed as a public street, bisects the site. It was designed by Moule & Polyzoides.

==== Norfolk, VA, East Beach ====
East Beach in Norfolk, VA, was designed and built in the style of traditional Atlantic coastal villages. The Master Plan for East Beach was developed in the style of “New Urbanism” by world renowned TND master planners Duany Plater-Zyberk. Newly constructed homes reflect traditional classic detail and proportion of Tidewater Virginia homes, and are built with materials that will withstand the test of time and forces of Mother Nature and the Chesapeake Bay.

=== Other countries ===
New Urbanism is closely related to the Urban village movement in Europe. They both occurred at similar times and share many of the same principles although urban villages has an emphasis on traditional city planning. In Europe many brown-field sites have been redeveloped since the 1980s following the models of the traditional city neighbourhoods rather than Modernist models. One well-publicized example is Poundbury in England, a suburban extension to the town of Dorchester, which was built on land owned by the Duchy of Cornwall under the overview of Prince Charles. The original masterplan was designed by Leon Krier. A report carried out after the first phase of construction found a high degree of satisfaction by residents, although the aspirations to reduce car dependency had not been successful. Rising house prices and a perceived premium have made the open market housing unaffordable for many local people.

The Council for European Urbanism (CEU), formed in 2003, shares many of the same aims as the U.S.'s New Urbanists. CEU's Charter is a development of the Congress for the New Urbanism Charter revised and reorganised to relate better to European conditions. An Australian organisation, Australian Council for New Urbanism has since 2001 run conferences and events to promote New Urbanism in that country. A New Zealand Urban Design Protocol was created by the Ministry for the Environment in 2005.

There are many developments around the world that follow New Urbanist principles to a greater or lesser extent:

==== Europe ====
The town of Poundbury in England, constructed in the New Urbanism form from 1988–present

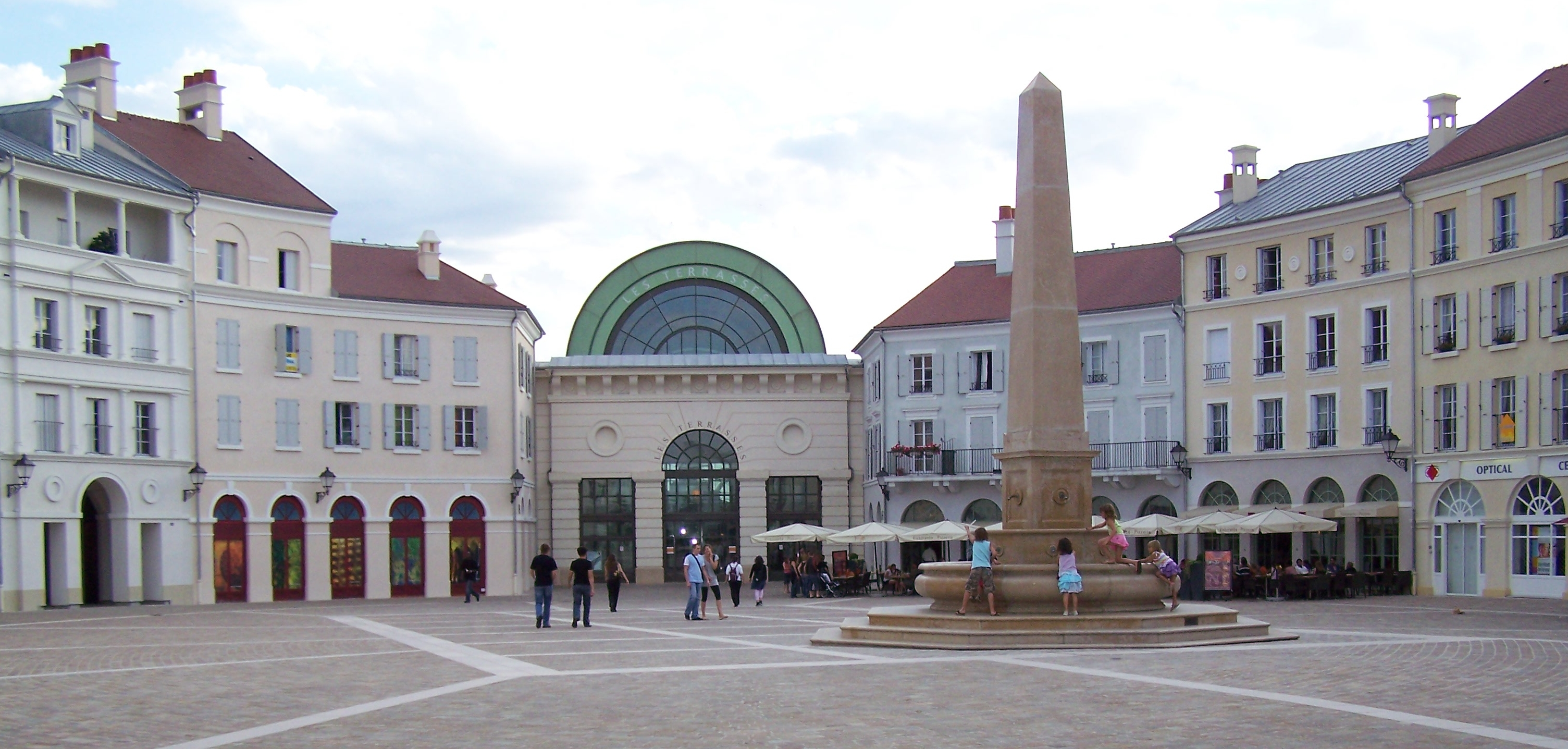
Place de Toscane in Serris, France, designed by new classical architect Pier Carlo Bontempi in 2002

- Le Plessis-Robinson, a 21st-century example of neo-traditionalism, in the south-west of Paris. This city is in the process of transforming itself, destroying old modern blocklike buildings and replacing them with traditional buildings and houses in one of the biggest worldwide projects with Val d'Europe. In 2008 the city was nominated best architectural project of the European Union.
- Poundbury, in Dorset, England, is a neotraditionalist urban extension focussed on high quality urban realm and the expression of traditional modes of urban or village life.
- Tornagrain, between Inverness and Nairn, Scotland, The design is based on the architectural and planning traditions of the Highlands and the rest of Scotland.
- Val d'Europe, east of Paris, France. Developed by Disneyland Resort Paris, this town is a kind of European counterpart to Walt Disney World Celebration City.
- Jakriborg, in Southern Sweden, is a recent example of the New Urbanist movement.
- Brandevoort, in Helmond, in the Netherlands, is a new example of the New Urbanist movement.
- Sankt Eriksområdet quarter in Stockholm, Sweden, built in the 1990s.
- Other developments can be found at Heulebrug, part of Knokke-Heist, in Belgium, and Fonti di Matilde in San Bartolomeo (outside of Reggio Emilia), Italy.
- Kartanonkoski, in Vantaa, Finland, is the only example of neotraditional architecture in Finland implemented on a larger scale. The area has around 4000 inhabitants and its architecture has been mainly influenced by Nordic Classicism.
- Vauban and its surrounding city Freiburg serve as centers for innovation integrating solar roofs, carbon neutral buildings, Passivhaus, and point-access block single-exit apartment blocks into the fabric of New Urbanist architecture and neighborhoods.

==== Americas ====
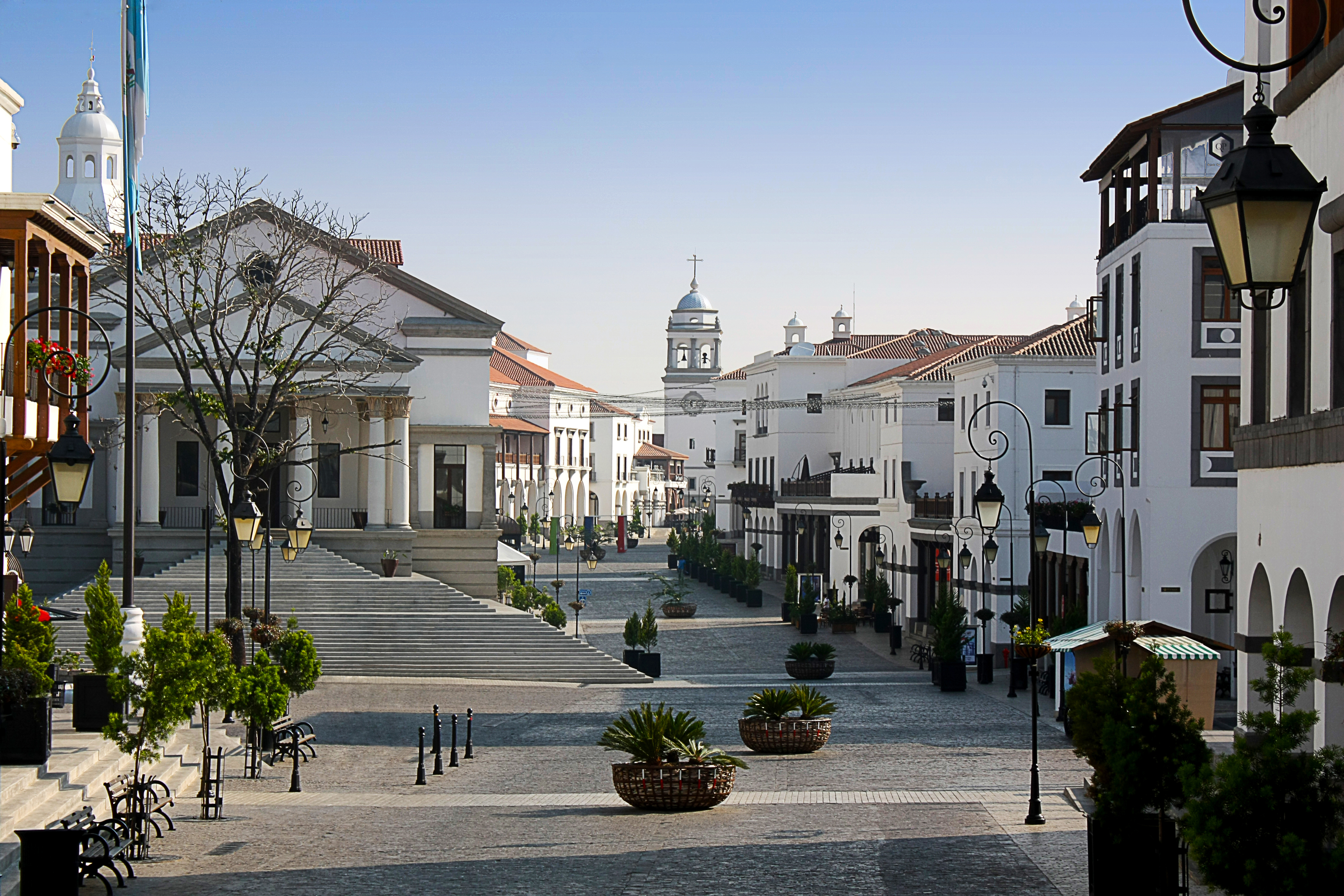
Ciudad Cayala in Guatemala City, Guatemala, founded in 2011

- Mahogany Bay Village, Belize, is 24-hectare (59-acre) New Urbanist community on Ambergris Caye, Belize.
- Orchid Bay, Belize, is one of the largest New Urbanist projects in Central America and the Caribbean.
- Las Catalinas, Costa Rica, is a coastal town in the Guanacaste Province of Northwest Costa Rica. Envisioned as a compact, walkable beach town, Las Catalinas was founded in 2006 by Charles Brewer and incorporates many of the principles of New Urbanism.
- McKenzie Towne is a New Urbanist development which commenced in 1995 by Carma Developers LP in Calgary.
- Cornell, within the city of Markham, Ontario, was designed with walkable neighborhoods, density to support public transit, a variety of housing types and retail.
- New Amherst is a new urbanist development in the town of Cobourg, Ontario.
- UniverCity, beside the Simon Fraser University campus on Burnaby Mountain in Burnaby, British Columbia, is a sustainable community that is designed to be walkable, dense, and well connected to public transit networks.
- Mount Pleasant Village in the city of Brampton, Ontario was designed as a mixed-use neighbourhood surrounding a train station and with a central square.

==== Asia ====
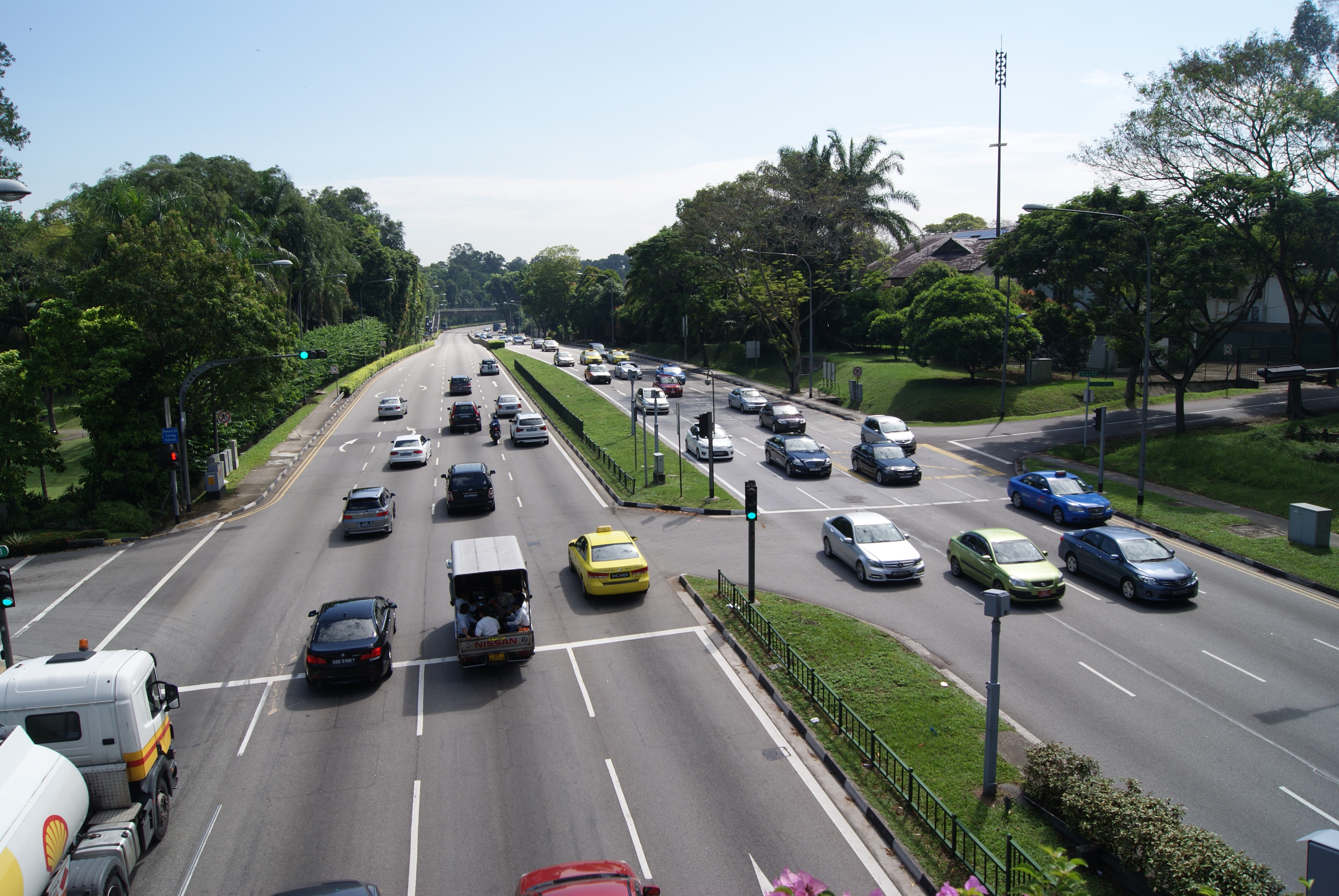
Traffic along Lornie Road, Singapore

- The structure plan for Thimphu, Bhutan, follows Principles of Intelligent Urbanism, which share underlying axioms with the New Urbanism.

==== Africa ====
There are several such developments in South Africa. The most notable is Melrose Arch in Johannesburg. Triple Point is a comparable mixed-use development in East London, in Eastern Cape province. The development, announced in 2007, comprises 30 hectares. It is made up of three apartment complexes together with over 30 residential sites as well as 20,000 sq m of residential and office space. The development is valued at over R2 billion ($250 million). There have been cases where market forces of urban decay are confused with new urbanism in African cities. This has led to a form of suburban mixed-use development that does not promote walkability.

==== Australia ====
Most new developments on the edges of Australia's major cities are master planned, often guided expressly by the principles of New Urbanism. The relationship between housing, activity centres, the transport network and key social infrastructure (sporting facilities, libraries, community centres etc.) is defined at structure planning stage.

- Jindee, Western Australia, a new coastal development north of Perth which has been designed using Smart Code.
- Tullimbar Village, New South Wales, is a new development which follows the principles of New Urbanism.

Another important factor or principle of New Urbanism that guides Australia's major cities is how good their foot circulation seems to be which is guided by the wayfinding systems that are implemented. Kenneth B. Hall Jr. and Gerald A. Porterfield said in their book, "Community by Design," the way to gain good circulation is to take some thoughtful consideration to things like wayfinding, sight lines, transition, visual clues, and reference points. Circulation design should work to create an interesting and informative system that utilizes subtle elements as well as technical ones. The City of Port Phillip, Australia, is a good example of wayfinding where they have come up with a comprehensive pedestrian signage system, specifically for their local areas of St Kilda, South Melbourne and Port Melbourne. The city's wayfinding system consists of 26 individually designed panels that are placed on some major streets such as St Kilda and St Kilda East, linking St Kilda Junction and Balaclava Station to the foreshore via Fitzroy, Carlisle and Acland Streets. The City of Port Phillip also created directional signage systems that makes use of the already existing street furniture such as trash cans to help provide for 130 directional indicators across Port Melbourne.

===== 20-minute neighbourhoods =====
Melbourne followed up a 2014 plan by launching 20-minute neighbourhoods in January 2018, aiming to provide for most daily needs within a 20-minute walk from home, together with safe cycling and public transport options. Another definition has used the time taken to cycle, or take a bus. In Melbourne the concept was initiated in the suburbs of Croydon South, Strathmore, and Sunshine West. The concept has since expanded to other cities, such as Singapore and Hamilton in New Zealand. Critics have pointed out that Melbourne's plan excludes jobs and that a previous target for public transport use has been shelved. The concept has been equated with localism.

Dubai launched the 20-minute city project in 2022, where residents are able to access daily needs & destinations within 20 minutes by foot or bicycle. The plan involves placing 55% of the residents within 800 meters of mass transit stations, allowing them to reach 80% of their daily needs and destinations.

== See also ==
- List of examples of New Urbanism

=== Urban planners, architects and New Urbanists ===
- Ivan Chtcheglov
- Walter F. Chatham
- Larry Beasley
- Christopher Charles Benninger
- Peter Calthorpe
- Andrés Duany
- Hans Kollhoff
- Leon Krier
- Gabriele Tagliaventi
- James Howard Kunstler
- Elizabeth Plater-Zyberk
- Sim Van der Ryn
- Pier Carlo Bontempi
- Ali Kemal Arkun
- Matthew Sergio Digoy

=== Locations ===
- Atlantic Station, Atlanta
- Birkdale Village, North Carolina
- Carlton Landing, Oklahoma
- Daybreak, South Jordan, Utah
- DeLand, FL
- Greenbelt, Maryland
- Issaquah Highlands, Issaquah, Washington
- Kentlands, Gaithersburg, Maryland
- National Harbor
- New Town, Missouri
- Orenco Station, Oregon (New Urbanist transit-oriented development)
- Beacon Cove
- Coed Darcy
- Poundbury
- Prospect New Town, Colorado
- Seabrook, Washington
- Verrado, Buckeye, Arizona
- Uptown, Dallas, Texas (New Urbanist area rated most pedestrian-friendly in Texas)
- Old York Village, Chesterfield Township, New Jersey

=== Topics ===
- Car-free movement
- Carsharing
- Circles of Sustainability
- Community building
- Crime prevention through environmental design
- European Urban Renaissance
- EcoMobility
- Garden City Movement
- Gentrification
- International Network for Traditional Building, Architecture & Urbanism
- Land recycling
- Land value tax
- Missing Middle Housing
- MIU (Movement for Israeli Urbanism)
- Mixed-use development
- Mobility transition
- Naked streets/Shared space
- New Classical Architecture
- New Pedestrianism)
- Principles of Intelligent Urbanism
- Pedestrian-oriented development
- Pedestrian Village
- Preservation development
- Traditional Neighborhood Development
- Urban decay
- Urbanism
- Urban green space
- Urban renaissance
- Urban resilience
- Urban sprawl
- Urban vitality
- Walking audit
- World Urbanism Day
- YIMBY
