= New Zealand Urban Design Protocol =

Design Protocol

The New Zealand Urban Design Protocol was published in March 2005 by the Ministry for the Environment to recognise the importance of urban design to the development of successful towns and cities. The protocol is a voluntary commitment by central and local government, property developers and investors, design professionals, educational institutes and other groups to undertake specific urban design initiatives.

== Six Essential Attributes ==
The protocol identifies six essential attributes that successful towns and cities share;

- Competitive places that thrive economically and facilitate creativity and innovation
- Liveable places that provide a choice of housing, work and lifestyle options
- Environmentally responsible places that manage all aspects of the environment sustainably
- Inclusive places that offer opportunities for all citizens
- Distinctive places that have a strong identity and sense of place
- Well-governed places that have a shared vision and sense of direction.

== The Seven Cs ==
The protocol is centred on “The Seven Cs”, which are considered the essential design qualities that create urban design;

- Context
- Character
- Choice
- Connections
- Creativity
- Custodianship
- Collaboration

== Authorship ==
The New Zealand Urban Design Protocol was prepared with input from the following professionals;

=== Urban Design Advisory Group ===
- Penny Pirrit, Manager Environmental Planning, Auckland City Council
- Robert Tongue, City Architect, Dunedin City Council
- Patrick Fontein, Principal, Kensington Properties; President, Auckland Branch of the Property Council of New Zealand
- John Sinclair, Consultant, Architectus
- Chris McDonald, Senior Lecturer, Victoria University School of Architecture
- Ernst Zollner, Lecturer, University of Auckland Department of Planning; Chief Advisor, Strategic and Economic Development, Wellington City Council
- Doug Leighton, Principal, EDG Planning & Design
- Karen Goodall, Executive Director, City for Auckland
- David Fox, Managing Director, Fox and Associates
- Simon Whiteley, Policy and Strategy Manager, Land Transport New Zealand
- John Tocker, Principal, David Jerram Architects
- Alison Dalziel, Advisor, Department of Prime Minister and Cabinet; Chair of the Sustainable Cities Senior Officials Group

=== Ministry for the Environment ===
- Lindsay Gow, Deputy Chief Executive and Chair of the Urban Design Advisory Group
- Luke Troy, Senior Advisor
- Yvonne Weeber, Senior Advisor
- Frances Lane Brooker, Senior Advisor
- Erica Sefton, Senior Advisor
