= Congress for the New Urbanism =

American urban design organization

- Formation: 1993; 33 years ago
- Founders: Peter Calthorpe; Andrés Duany; Elizabeth Moule; Elizabeth Plater-Zyberk; Stefanos Polyzoides; Daniel Solomon
- Type: Non-profit organization
- Headquarters: Chicago, Illinois, United States
- President and CEO: Meg Walker
- Website: www.cnu.org

The Congress for the New Urbanism (CNU) is an American non-profit organization established in 1993 that promotes traditional neighborhood development, walkable urban form, transit-oriented development, and form-based zoning regulations as alternatives to post-World War II suburban sprawl. Headquartered in Chicago, Illinois, the organization engages architects, urban planners, real estate developers, municipal officials, and community advocates. The CNU organizes annual congresses, produces design guidelines, and advocates for policy reforms in land-use regulation and transportation planning.

== History ==
The conceptual origin of the CNU dates to the adoption of the Ahwahnee Principles in 1991, formulated at Yosemite National Park under the auspices of California's Local Government Commission. Two years later, in 1993, six urban designers and architects—Peter Calthorpe, Andrés Duany, Elizabeth Moule, Elizabeth Plater-Zyberk, Stefanos Polyzoides, and Daniel Solomon—founded the Congress for the New Urbanism to formalize an institutional framework against low-density, automobile-dependent suburban growth patterns.

The inaugural congress met in Alexandria, Virginia, in 1993 with approximately one hundred participants. Attendance expanded substantially during the late 1990s and 2000s, reaching several thousand delegates at annual events. Beginning in 2004, the CNU established regional and state chapters, starting with New England and Florida. Regional chapters later expanded into Canada, including chapters in Ontario and Cascadia, the latter spanning British Columbia and the U.S. Pacific Northwest.

== Core principles and charter ==
At the fourth congress in Charleston, South Carolina, in 1996, the organization formally adopted the Charter of the New Urbanism. The Charter outlines twenty-seven principles divided into three geographic and structural scales:

1. The metropolis, city, and town
2. The neighborhood, the district, and the corridor
3. The block, the street, and the building

The Charter posits that physical planning solutions must support social interaction, economic vitality, and environmental preservation. It advocates compact, mixed-use neighborhoods featuring interconnected street networks, varied housing stock catering to diverse income levels, accessible public spaces, and building orientations that define clear street walls.

== Youth initiatives and affiliated institutes ==
Student groups formed Students for the New Urbanism (SNU) around 2002 at institutions such as the University of Georgia, the University of Miami, the University of Notre Dame, and the Savannah College of Art and Design. At the 2003 congress in Washington, D.C., younger attendees drafted the "Manifesto of the Next Generation of New Urbanists," leading to the formal establishment of the Next Generation of New Urbanists (NextGen) in 2004. This group initiated early publications on Tactical Urbanism and supported the Emerging New Urbanists (ENU) network.

Several specialized research bodies evolved from CNU working groups into independent non-profit organizations. The Form-Based Codes Institute (FBCI) develops standards and training for land-development regulations focused on physical building form rather than separation of uses. The National Charrette Institute (NCI) provides education in accelerated, multi-day community design processes. The Center for Applied Transect Studies (CATS) promotes transect-based planning principles, including the SmartCode development regulation template.

== International reach and affiliated networks ==
Although concentrated primarily in North America, CNU concepts have influenced similar international networks. In Europe, the Council for European Urbanism (CEU) and the International Network for Traditional Building, Architecture & Urbanism (INTBAU) promote urban design principles aligned with traditional architecture and local heritage. In the United Kingdom, organisations such as The King's Foundation and Create Streets advocate human-scaled streetscapes and traditional building techniques, supported by national policy recommendations in the Living with Beauty report. Other international counterpart groups include the Australian Council for the New Urbanism (ACNU), the Council for Canadian Urbanism (CanU), and the Movement for Israeli Urbanism (MIU). In the US, CNU shares various objectives and approaches with the organization Strong Towns.

== Policy partnerships and industry standards ==
The CNU collaborates with environmental and professional organizations on development standards. In partnership with the United States Green Building Council (USGBC) and the Natural Resources Defense Council (NRDC), the CNU formulated the LEED for Neighborhood Development (LEED-ND) rating system, which evaluates neighborhood projects for environmental performance, location efficiency, and urban design quality. Additionally, the CNU partnered with the Institute of Transportation Engineers (ITE) to publish a design manual for walkable urban thoroughfares using Context Sensitive Solutions (CSS).

== Academic reception and critiques ==
Scholars in urban planning, geography, and sociology have evaluated the influence and outcomes of the CNU. Proponents highlight its success in reframing debates on public health, active transportation, and the adoption of form-based zoning in major municipal master plans, such as Miami 21 and the Denver Zoning Code.

Critics argue that early greenfield developments associated with New Urbanism, such as Seaside, Florida and Celebration, Florida, exhibited high property values and limited socioeconomic diversity despite charter goals prioritizing social equity. Other academic studies note that while CNU design guidelines successfully promote pedestrian infrastructure, regulatory barriers and market dynamics frequently limit their broader application in infill redevelopment, occasionally leading to gentrification in certified LEED-ND districts.

== See also ==
- New Urbanism
- Smart Growth
- Form-based code
- Transit-oriented development
- Suburban sprawl
