= LEED for Neighborhood Development =

LEED for Neighborhood Development (LEED-ND), where "LEED" stands for Leadership in Energy and Environmental Design, is a United States–based rating system that integrates the principles of smart growth, urbanism, and green building into a national system for neighborhood design. LEED certification provides independent, third-party verification that a development's location and design meet accepted high levels of environmentally responsible, sustainable development.

The LEED-ND system is a collaboration between the United States Green Building Council, the Congress for the New Urbanism, and the Natural Resources Defense Council.

== Significance of LEED-ND certification ==
LEED for Neighborhood Development recognizes development projects that successfully protect and enhance the overall health, natural environment, and quality of life. The rating system encourages smart growth and New Urbanism best practices by:

- Promoting the location and design of neighborhoods that reduce vehicle miles travelled (VMT)
- Creating developments where jobs and services are accessible by foot or public transit
- Promoting an array of green building and green infrastructure practices, particularly for more efficient energy and water use
- Protecting and conserving habitat, wetlands, water bodies, and prime agricultural lands through the maintenance of natural areas and "smart location" choices

Cities are increasingly using LEED-ND certification to accelerate the development of certified projects.

== Project types ==
LEED for Neighborhood Development is designed to certify exemplary development projects that perform well in terms of smart growth, urbanism, and green building. Projects may constitute whole neighborhoods, portions of neighborhoods, or multiple neighborhoods. Projects are often mixed-use, though small single-use projects that complement existing neighborhood uses may also use the rating system. Local jurisdictions should not use LEED-ND as a replacement for comprehensive planning, however, many local jurisdictions may find that LEED for Neighborhood Development is a meaningful tool to help promote sustainable land development if incentivized or used as a guideline when revising local codes and regulations.

== Site types ==
Before categorization, the neighborhood is defined by its site type depending on "where the boundary is set, the status of land inside the boundary, and the status of properties surrounding the boundary." The following sites are acceptable for LEED-ND:

- Previously developed land has to have been at least 75% complete prior to the construction of the new LEED certified ND.
- Infill sites
- Sites adjacent to existing developments

== Credit categories ==
The following credit categories are included in the rating system:

Smart Location and Linkage
Encourages communities to consider location, transportation alternatives, and preservation of sensitive lands while also discouraging sprawl. In order to qualify as a smart location, the project must "...be located (1) on an infill site; (2) within walking distance of public transit stops; (3) in an areas with preexisting shops, services, and facilities; or (4) on a site where evidence shows that the average per capita rate of vehicle miles traveled will be lower than that for the metropolitan region as a whole."
Neighborhood Pattern and Design
Emphasizes vibrant, equitable communities that are healthy, walkable and mixed-use.
Green Infrastructure and Buildings
Promotes the design and construction of buildings and infrastructure that reduce energy and water use, while promoting more sustainable use of materials, reuse of existing and historic structures, and other sustainable best practices.
Innovation and Design Process
Recognizes exemplary and innovative performance reaching beyond the existing credits in the rating system, as well as the value of including an accredited professional on the design team.
Regional Priority
Encourages projects to focus on earning credits of significance to the project's local environment.

== Stages of certification ==
LEED for Neighborhood Development differs from other commercial and residential LEED rating systems as it has three stages of certification that relate to phases of real-estate development:

Stage 1: Conditionally Approved Plan
Provides the conditional approval of a LEED-ND Plan available for projects before they have completed the entitlements, or public review, process. It is envisioned that completing Stage 1 will help projects get support from the local government and from the community.
Stage 2: Pre-Certified Plan
Pre-certifies a LEED-ND plan and is applicable for fully entitled projects or projects under construction. Completing this review can help projects secure financing, expedited permitting or attract tenants.
Stage 3: Certified Neighborhood Development
Completed projects formally apply for LEED certification to recognize that the project has achieved all the prerequisites and credits attempted.

== LEED-ND and other LEED rating systems ==
All LEED-ND projects are required to have at least one certified green building – "the LEED rating for new construction requires developers to complete a detailed checklist and awards 64 possible points for green building practices". Basic certification requires 40-49 points, silver 50-59 points, gold 60-79 points, and 80+ points for platinum certification. Points are also available within the LEED for Neighborhood Development rating system for having certified green buildings in the development and for integrating green building and infrastructure practices within the project. These credits relate to energy efficiency, reduced water use, building reuse, recycled materials, and heat island reduction.
