= Elizabeth Plater-Zyberk =

American architect and urban planner

- Plater-Zyberk in 2015
- Born: December 20, 1950 (age 75); Bryn Mawr, Pennsylvania, U.S.
- Occupations: Architect and urban planner
- Known for: University of Miami architecture professor, advocate of New Urbanism

Elizabeth Plater-Zyberk (born December 20, 1950) is a professor at the University of Miami's School of Architecture and an architect and urban planner in Miami, Florida.

Plater-Zyberk is considered to be a representative of the New Urbanism school of urban planning, and an advocate of the New Classical school of architecture. She is also a co-founder and principal of DPZ CoDesign, a Miami-based architecture firm.

== Early life and education ==
Plater-Zyberk was born in Bryn Mawr, Pennsylvania, the daughter of Jozafat Plater-Zyberk (1906–1994), an architect, and his wife, Maria Meysztowicz (1911–2000), a professor of French at Villanova University. Plater-Zyberk is an alumna of Sacred Heart Academy Bryn Mawr, and received her undergraduate degree in architecture and urban planning from Princeton University (1972) and a master's degree in architecture from the Yale School of Architecture in 1974. She also received an honorary Doctorate in Fine Arts from the Yale School of Architecture in 2023.

== Career ==
In 1977, Plater-Zyberk co-founded the Miami firm Arquitectonica with her husband Andrés Duany, Bernardo Fort-Brescia, Laurinda Hope Spear, and Hervin Romney. Arquitectonica was known for its signature style: a dramatic, expressive high-tech modernism. The firm's Atlantis Condominium was featured in the opening credits of the television series Miami Vice.

In 1980, Duany and Plater-Zyberk founded DPZ CoDesign, based in Miami. DPZ became a leader in the national movement called New Urbanism and distinguished itself by designing traditional towns and transforming existing suburbs into livable downtowns. The firm first received international recognition in the 1980s as the designer of Seaside, Florida, and has completed designs and codes for over two hundred new towns, regional plans, and community revitalization projects.

Plater-Zyberk has taught at the University of Miami School of Architecture since 1979. In 1988, she created a graduate program in Suburb and Town Design after which she continued to explore contemporary issues in city growth and reconstruction with students and faculty. She served as dean of the university's School of Architecture from 1995 to 2013, and as dean she hired the architect Léon Krier to design his first public building in Florida for the school of architecture (his only other buildings in America are his former house at Seaside and a meeting hall in the Duany Plater-Zyberk planned resort of Windsor). She has also served as director of the university's Center for Urban Community and Design, organizing and promoting numerous design exercises to the benefit of communities throughout South Florida. In the Fall of 2008, Plater-Zyberk was tapped into Iron Arrow Honor Society, the highest Honor attained at the University of Miami. In 2014, she was awarded the Arts & Culture Award by the Coral Gables Community Foundation.

For ten years, Plater-Zyberk was a trustee of Princeton University, where she chaired the university's Building Committee during an active period of building and expansion. During her tenure on the Building Committee, the university hired architects such as Robert Venturi, Frank Gehry, and Demetri Porphyrios. Porphyrios designed the Collegiate Gothic Whitman College, the first in a series of new Collegiate Gothic buildings to be built in the historic center of the Princeton campus.

Plater-Zyberk is a founder and emeritus board member of the Congress for the New Urbanism, which was established in 1993. She has been a visiting professor at many major North American schools of architecture, has been awarded several honorary doctorates and awards, and lectures frequently. In 2001, she and Duany were awarded the Vincent Scully Prize by the National Building Museum in recognition of their contributions to the American built environment. In 2008, she was appointed to the U.S. Commission of Fine Arts. Her recent books include The New Civic Art and Suburban Nation: The Rise of Sprawl and the Decline of the American Dream.

== See also ==
- List of American architects

== Sources ==
- Duany, Andrés, Elizabeth Plater-Zyberk, and Jeff Speck (2000). Suburban Nation: The Rise of Sprawl and the Decline of the American Dream. New York: North Point Press. ISBN 0-86547-606-3
- Duany, Andrés, Elizabeth Plater-Zyberk, and Robert Alminana (2003). The New Civic Art: Elements of Town Planning. New York: Rizzoli International Publications. ISBN 0-8478-2186-2
- Lombard, Joanna (2005). The Architecture of Duany Plater-Zyberk and Company. New York: Rizzoli International Publications. ISBN 0-8478-2600-7
