= Andrés Duany =

American architect and urban planner

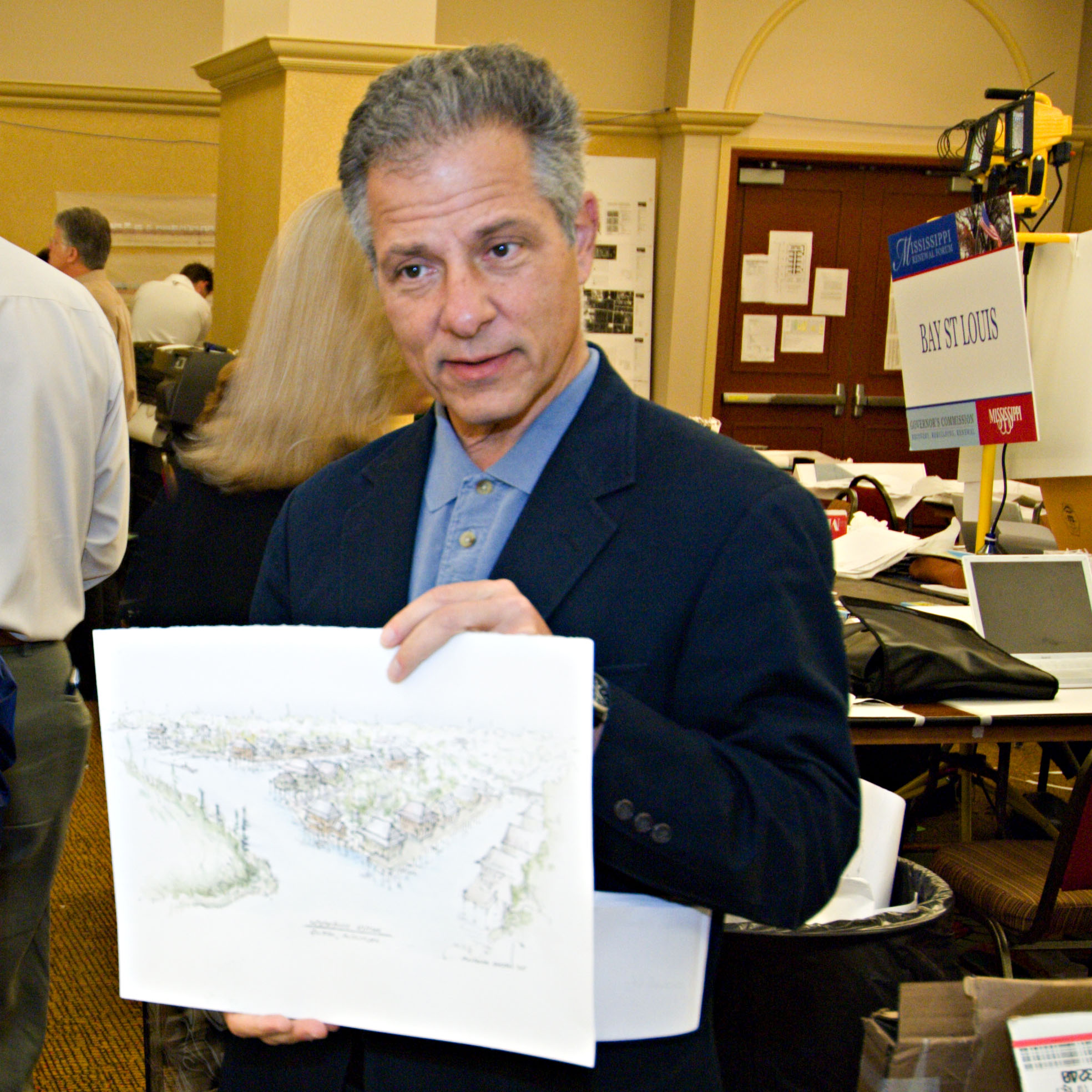
- Andrés Duany
- Born: September 7, 1949 (age 76); New York City, US
- Occupations: Architect and urban planner
- Known for: founder of the Congress for the New Urbanism

Andrés Duany (born September 7, 1949) is an American architect, urban planner, and a founder of the Congress for the New Urbanism.

== Early life and education ==
Duany was born in New York City but grew up in Cuba until 1960. He attended The Choate School and Aiglon College and received his undergraduate degree in architecture and urban planning from Princeton University (1971). After a year of study at the École des Beaux-Arts in Paris, he received a master's degree from the Yale School of Architecture (1974). He has also received an honorary Doctorate of Fine Arts from Yale School of Architecture (2023).

== Career ==
In 1977, Duany co-founded the Miami firm Arquitectonica with his wife, Elizabeth Plater-Zyberk, Bernardo Fort-Brescia, Laurinda Spear, and Hervin Romney. Arquitectonica was known for its playful, Latin-American influenced modernism. The firm's Atlantis Condominium was featured in the opening credits of the television series Miami Vice.

In 1980, Duany and Elizabeth Plater-Zyberk founded Duany Plater-Zyberk & Company (DPZ), an architecture firm based in Miami. DPZ participated in the formation of the international urban planning movement known as New Urbanism, intended to offer an alternative to suburban sprawl and urban disinvestment. The firm first received recognition as the designer of new towns such as Seaside, Florida and Kentlands, Maryland. The firm has since completed designs and codes for over three hundred new towns, regional plans, and inner-city revitalization projects. Duany is also considered to be a representative of New Classical Architecture.

Duany is a co-founder and emeritus board member of the Congress for the New Urbanism (CNU), established in 1993. He has co-authored five books: Suburban Nation: The Rise of Sprawl and the Decline of the American Dream; The New Civic Art; The Smart Growth Manual; Garden Cities; and Landscape Urbanism and Its Discontents. Duany has worked as visiting professor at many institutions and holds two honorary doctorates. He is a fellow of the American Institute of Architects and an adjunct professor at the University of Miami.

== Awards ==
Duany and his partner, Elizabeth Plater-Zyberk, have been awarded several honorary doctorates and awards including the Vincent Scully Prize by the National Building Museum in recognition of their contributions to the American built environment. Duany has been awarded the Brandeis Award for Architecture, the Thomas Jefferson Medal in Architecture, the Arthur Ross Award in Community Planning, the Richard H. Driehaus Prize for Classical Architecture, the Society of American Registered Architects International Award, and the Albert Simons Medal of Excellence, among other awards.

== Books ==
- Duany, Andrés, Elizabeth Plater-Zyberk, and Jeff Speck (2000). Suburban Nation: The Rise of Sprawl and the Decline of the American Dream. New York: North Point Press. ISBN 0-86547-606-3
- Duany, Andrés, Elizabeth Plater-Zyberk, and Robert Alminana (2003). The New Civic Art: Elements of Town Planning. New York: Rizzoli International Publications. ISBN 0-8478-2186-2
- Duany, Andrés and Jeff Speck, with Mike Lydon (2009). The Smart Growth Manual. New York: McGraw-Hill. ISBN 0-07-137675-5
- Duany, Andrés and DPZ (2011). Garden Cities: Theory & Practice of Agrarian Urbanism, The Prince's Foundation for the Built Environment
