= DPZ CoDesign =

U.S. architecture and town planning firm

DPZ CoDesigns
- Type: Public
- Industry: Architecture
- Founded: 1980
- Founder: Andrés Duany and Elizabeth Plater-Zyberk
- Headquarters: United States
- Key people: Andrés Duany Elizabeth Plater-Zyberk
- Website: https://www.dpz.com/

DPZ CoDesign (DPZ) (formerly Duany Plater-Zyberk & Co. and DPZ Partners) is an architecture and town planning firm based in Miami, Florida. It was founded in 1980 by Andrés Duany and Elizabeth Plater-Zyberk.

Besides Duany and Plater-Zyberk, DPZ's current partners are Galina Tachieva, Marina Khoury, Senen M. A. Antonio, and Matthew J. Lambert. The New Urbanist firm's main areas of practice include regional and downtown plans, new towns, urban infill, villages and resort villages, and transit-oriented development. DPZ also works on suburban retrofits, campuses, housing, and civic buildings.

The firm is headquartered in Miami, Florida, and has offices in Gaithersburg, Maryland, and Portland, Oregon.

== Disaster recovery planning ==
DPZ organized and led the Mississippi Renewal Forum, which generated plans for eleven municipalities along the Mississippi Coast. They prepared a series of typological plans for recovery and redevelopment of the Southern Louisiana coast under the Louisiana Speaks effort. Additionally, the company participated in the Unified New Orleans Plan as the neighborhood planner for the French Quarter, the Central Business District and Gentilly. Following the earthquake that struck Haiti in 2010, DPZ, working under The Prince's Foundation for the Built Environment (TPFBE), prepared a recovery plan for Port-au-Prince.

== Awards ==
DPZ has received several awards for its work, including two National AIA Awards, the Thomas Jefferson Award, the Vincent Scully Prize, and Richard H. Driehaus Prize. The firm's Seaside, Florida project was the first authentic new town to be built in the United States in over fifty years. In 1989, Time, a news magazine, selected Seaside as one of the 10 "Best of the Decade" achievements in the field of design.
