= List of examples of New Urbanism =

The following towns, neighborhoods, and developments are examples of New Urbanism.

== Australia ==
=== New South Wales ===
- Cape Cabarita, Cabarita
- Tullimbar Village, Shellharbour (proposal)

=== South Australia ===
- Mawson Lakes, North Adelaide

=== Tasmania ===
- Skylands, Tranmere (proposal)

=== Victoria ===
- Beacon Cove, Port Melbourne
- Kensington Banks/Lynch's Bridge, Kensington
- Rippleside, North Geelong
- Waterford Green, Footscray

=== Western Australia ===
- Ascot Waters, Belmont
- Claisebrook Village, East Perth
- Cockburn Central, Perth
- Ellenbrook, Perth
- Marlston Hill, Bunbury
- Subi Centro, Subiaco
- The Village at Wellard, Wellard

== Bhutan ==
- Thimphu

== Canada ==
=== Alberta ===
- Alpine Park, Calgary
- Garrison Woods, Calgary
- Griesbach, Edmonton
- McKenzie Towne, Calgary
- Terwillegar Towne, Edmonton

=== British Columbia ===
- South East False Creek (Olympic Village), Vancouver

=== Ontario ===
- Cornell Village, Markham
- Village on the Twelve, St. Catharines

== Costa Rica ==
- Las Catalinas

== Europe ==
=== Belgium ===
- Heulebrug, Knokke-Heist

=== Finland ===
- Kartanonkoski, Vantaa

=== France ===
- Val d'Europe

=== Georgia ===
- Green Lisi Town

=== Italy ===
- Borgo Città Nuova, Alessandria
- Fonti di Matile, Reggio Emilia

=== Germany ===
- Anklam market square and riverfront
- Gladbeck, Michael Stojan projects
- Kirchsteigfeld (Drewitz), Potsdam
- Rieselfeld, Freiburg
- Vauban, Freiburg

=== Netherlands ===
- Brandevoort, Helmond
- Weespersluis, Weesp
- Vleuterweide, Utrecht

=== Poland ===
- Elbląg, town center masterplan
- Szczecin, town center masterplan

=== Portugal ===
- Alta de Lisboa, Lisbon

=== Sweden ===
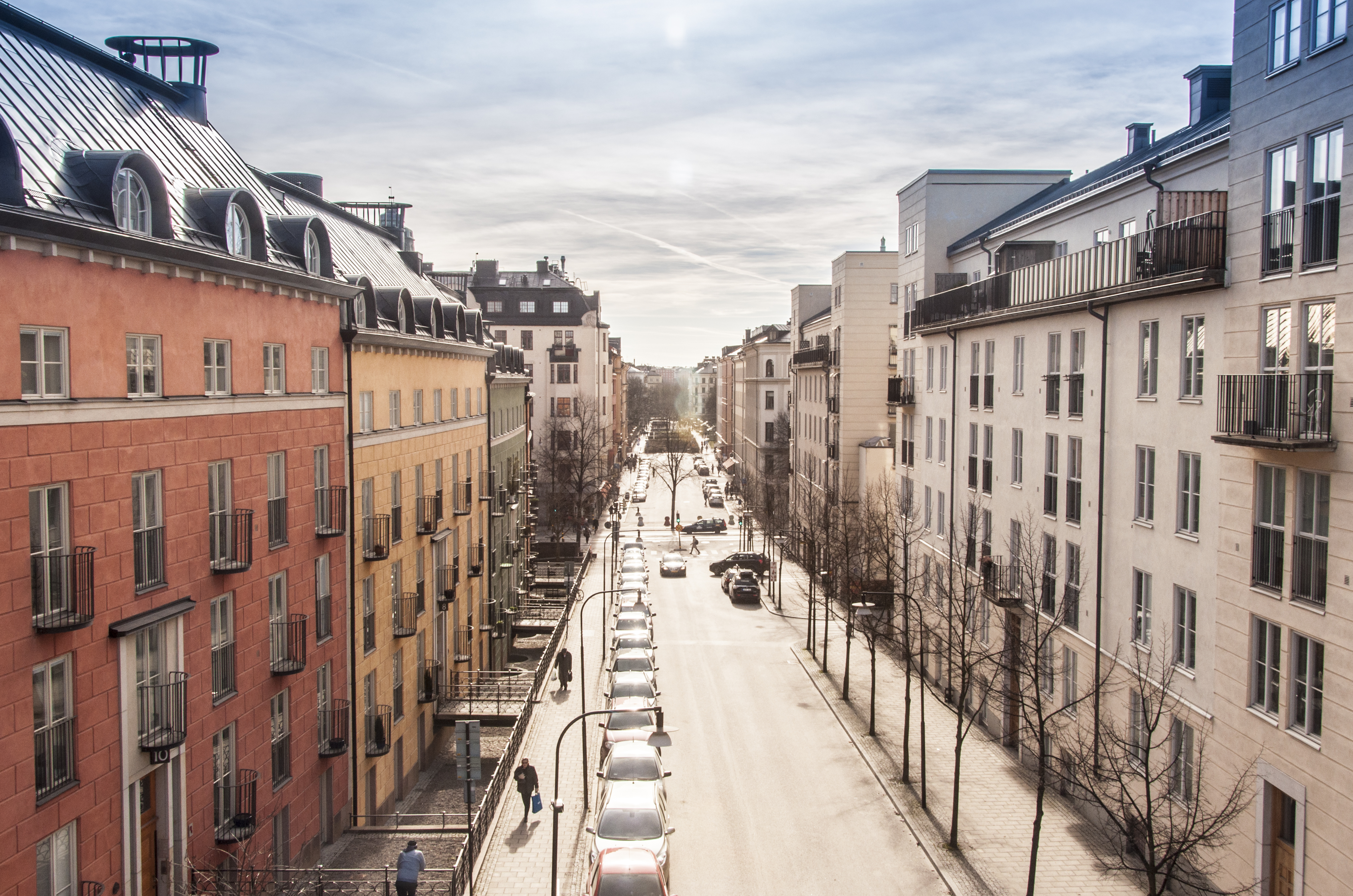
New Urbanist Sankt Eriksområdet quarter in Stockholm, Sweden, built in the 1990s.

- Jakriborg, Hjärup
- Sankt Eriksområdet, Stockholm

=== United Kingdom ===
- Chapelton, Aberdeenshire
- Coed Darcy, Wales
- Knockroon, East Ayrshire
- Poundbury, Dorset
- Tornagrain, Inverness-shire

== India ==
- Lavasa

== Mexico ==
- La Primavera, Leon

== United States ==
=== Alabama ===
- Blount Springs, Blount Springs
- Hampstead, Montgomery
- Mt. Laurel, Shelby County
- Providence, Huntsville
- The Village Tannin, Orange Beach
- The Ledges, Huntsville
- The Preserve, Hoover
- Trussville Springs, Trussville

=== Arizona ===
- Agritopia, Gilbert
- Civano, Tucson
- Culdesac, Tempe
- Mercado District, Tucson
- Verrado, Buckeye

=== Arkansas ===
Northwest Arkansas

- Crystal Flats, Bentonville
- Drake Farms, Fayetteville (Planned)
- Har-Ber Meadows, Springdale
- Johnson Square, Johnson
- Mount Comfort Square, Fayetteville (Planned)
- Pier 6, Rogers (Planned)
- Red Barn Agrihood, Bentonville

Elsewhere in Arkansas

- Kelly Ridge, Fort Smith
- The Village at Hendrix, Conway

=== California ===
- Chico - Barber Yard, Doe Mill, Meriam Park, Westside Place
- City of Villages, San Diego
- Civita, San Diego
- Laguna West, Elk Grove
- Playa Vista, Los Angeles
- Aggie Village, Davis
- Platinum Triangle, Anaheim
- Bay Meadows, San Mateo, California

=== Colorado ===
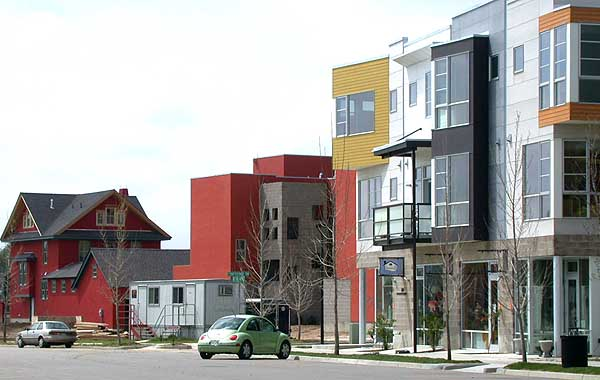
Prospect New Town in Longmont, Colorado, showing a mix of aggregate housing and traditional detached homes

- Bradburn Village, Westminster
- Central Park in Denver
- Highlands' Garden Village, Denver
- Prospect New Town, Longmont
- South Main in Buena Vista
- Three Springs in Durango

=== Florida ===
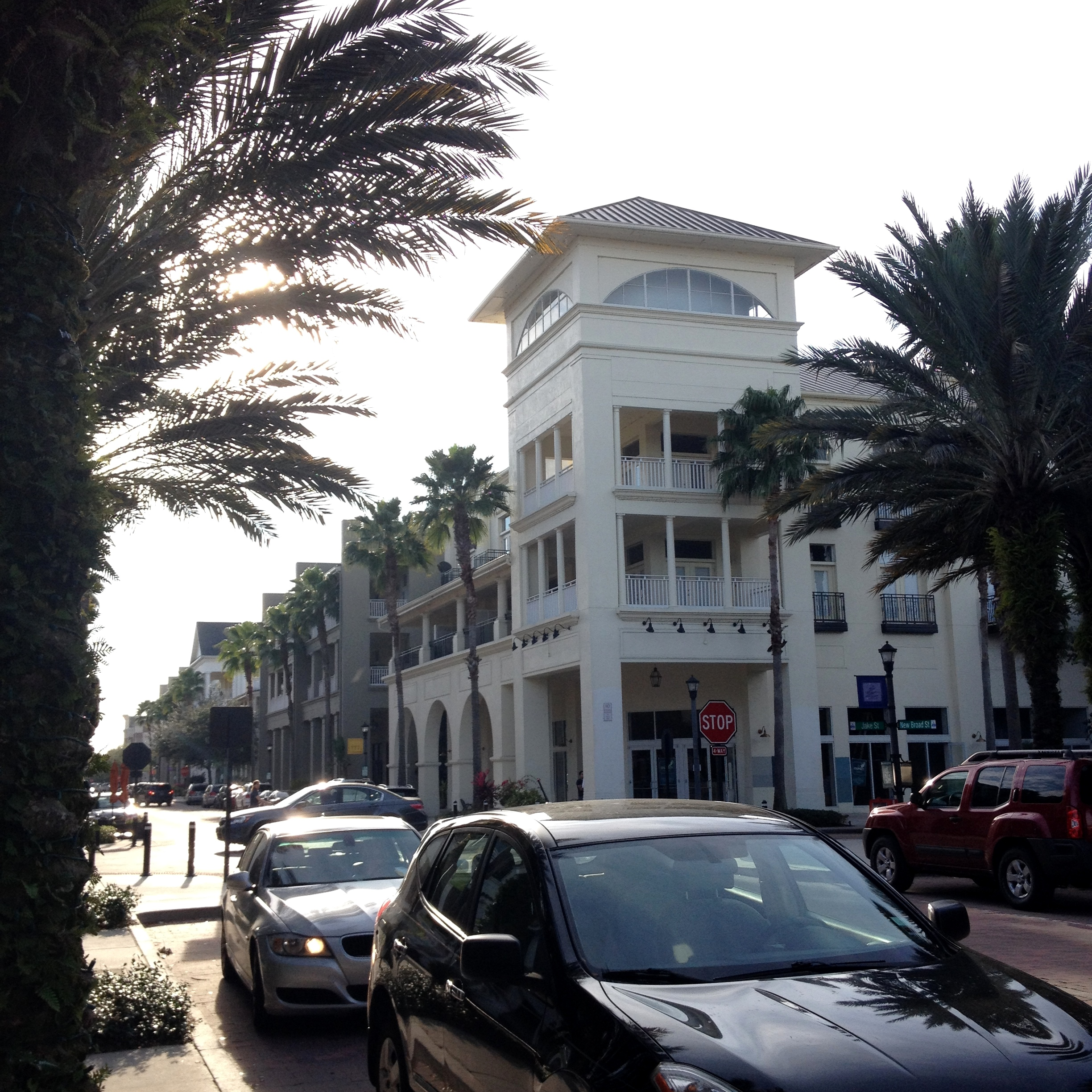
New Broad Street, Baldwin Park, Florida

- Abacoa, Jupiter
- Alys Beach
- Amelia Park on Amelia Island, Fernandina Beach
- Aragon, Pensacola
- Avalon Park, near Orlando
- Baldwin Park, Orlando
- Brytan, Gainesville
- Disney's Celebration
- Golden Oak at Walt Disney World Resort
- Haile Plantation, Gainesville
- Harmony, near St. Cloud
- Independence, near Winter Garden
- Laureate Park, Lake Nona
- Miami Lakes
- Mizner Park, Boca Raton
- Oakland Park, Winter Garden
- Owl's Head, Freeport
- ParkSquare, Aventura
- Reunion, near Celebration
- Rosemary Beach
- Rosemary Square, West Palm Beach
- Salamanca, Miami
- Seaside
- Sky, Calhoun County
- SouthWood, Tallahassee
- Town of Tioga, Florida, Tioga, Florida
- Tradition, near Port St. Lucie
- WaterColor, near Destin
- Winthrop, Brandon
- The Villages, Central Florida

=== Georgia ===
- Glenwood Park, Atlanta
- Inman Park Village, Atlanta
- Serenbe, Chattachoochee Hills
- Tributary at New Manchester, Douglasville
- Vickery, Cumming
- Trilith, Fayetteville
- Downtown Woodstock, Woodstock

=== Hawaii ===
- Olawalu Town, Olowalu, Maui

=== Idaho ===
- Woodbury, Moscow

=== Illinois ===
- Prairie Crossing, Grayslake
- Arlington Park, Arlington Heights (Proposed)
- The Glen, Glenview

=== Indiana ===
- Anson, Anson
- Saxony, Saxony
- West Clay, Carmel

=== Iowa ===
- The Peninsula Neighborhood, Iowa City
- Village of Ponderosa, West Des Moines
- West Glen Town Center, West Des Moines
- Prairie Trail, Ankeny

=== Kansas ===
- Greensburg
- City Center, Lenexa
- New Market, Kansas City
- Park Place, Leawood

=== Kentucky ===
Louisville

- Liberty Green, Phoenix Hill
- Norton Commons, Worthington
- Park DuValle, Park DuValle
- RiverPark Place, Butchertown

=== Louisiana ===
- Acadia Plantation, Thibodaux
- Perkins Rowe, Baton Rouge
- Provenance, Shreveport
- River Garden, New Orleans
- River Ranch, Lafayette
- Riverview, West Baton Rouge Parish
- Settlement at Willow Grove, Baton Rouge
- Sugar Mill Pond, Youngsville
- TerraBella, Covington
- Village at Magnolia Square, Central

=== Maryland ===
- Kentlands , Gaithersburg
- King Farm, Rockville
- Lakelands, Gaithersburg
- Stage Coach Crossing, La Plata (Planned)
- Summerfield, Snow Hill (Planned)
- Sunset Island, Ocean City

=== Massachusetts ===
- Mashpee Commons, Mashpee

=== Michigan ===
- Cherry Hill Village, Cherry Hill

=== Minnesota ===
- Clover Ridge, Chaska
- Excelsior and Grand, St. Louis Park
- Heart of the City, Burnsville
- Penn and American, Bloomington
- Lino Lakes Town Center , Lino Lakes
- The Shoppes at Arbor Lakes, Maple Grove

=== Mississippi ===
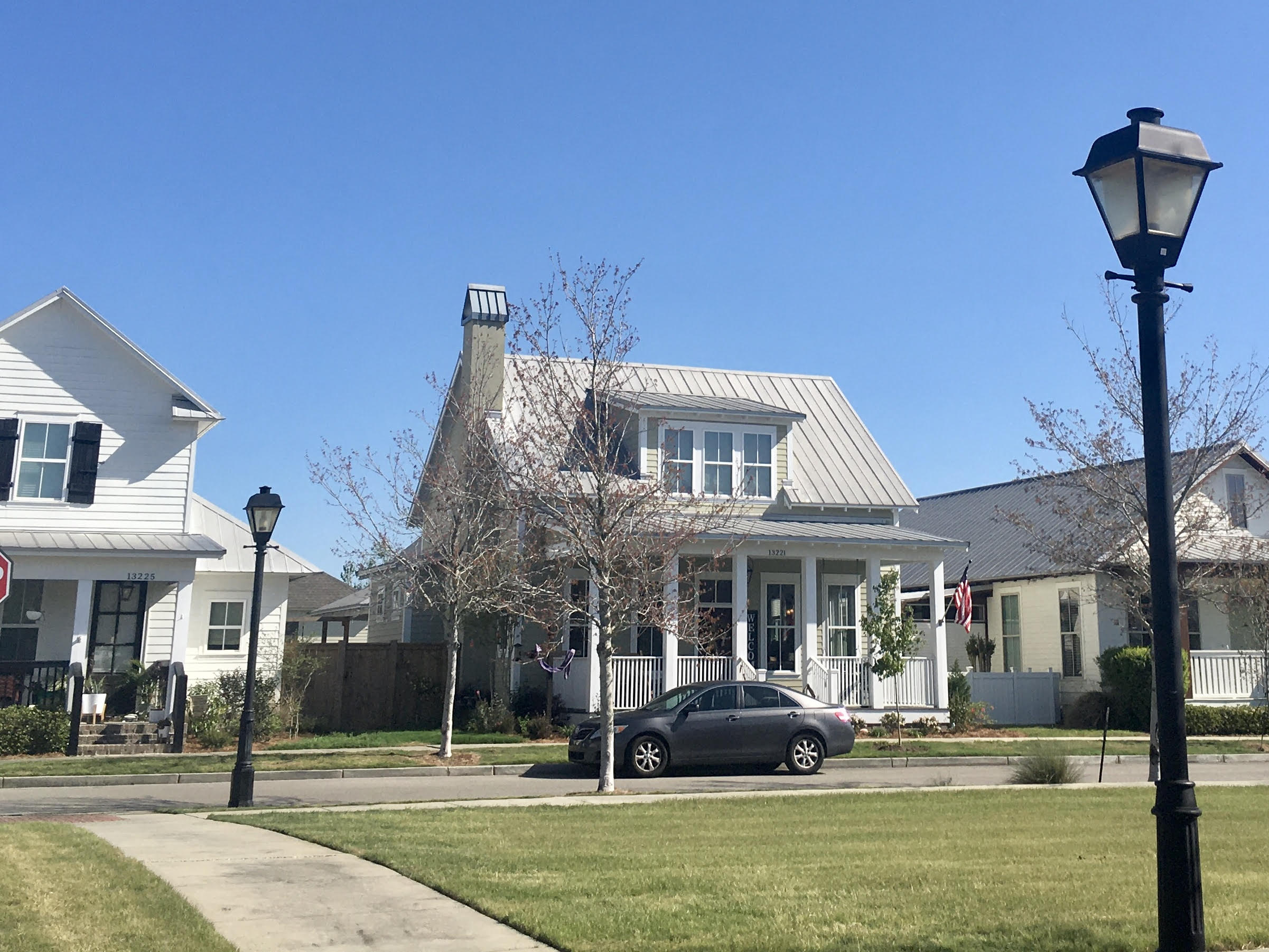
Westminster Boulevard, Florence Gardens in Gulfport, Mississippi

- Bellegrass, Hattiesburg
- The Cotton District, Starkville
- Florence Gardens, Gulfport
- The Town of Lost Rabbit, Madison County
- Plein Air, Taylor
- Tradition, Harrison County

=== Missouri ===
Kansas City Area

- Crescent Creek Homes, Raytown
- New Longview Lake, Lee's Summit
- Northgate Village, North Kansas City
- River Market, Kansas City
- The New Town at Liberty, Liberty
- The Village at Chapman Lake, Blue Springs
- The Village at Shoal Creek Valley, Kansas City
- Zona Rosa, Kansas City

St. Louis Area

- Station Plaza, Kirkwood
- The New Town at St. Charles, St. Charles
- The Wildwood Town Center, Wildwood

Elsewhere in Missouri

- Village of Cherry Hill, Columbia
- Chesterfield Village, Springfield

=== New Mexico ===
- Aldea de Santa Fe, Santa Fe
- Mesa del Sol, Albuquerque

=== New Jersey ===
- Bayfront, Jersey City
- Old York Village, Chesterfield Township
- Canal Crossing, Jersey City
- University Heights, Newark

=== New York ===
- Ewen Point, Esopus Lake
- Warwick Grove, Warwick

=== North Carolina ===
- Ayrsley, Charlotte
- Afton Village, Concord
- Biltmore Park, Asheville
- Birkdale Village, Huntersville
- Cheshire, Black Mountain
- Harrisburg Town Center, Harrisburg
- Lake Park, Union County
- Mayfaire Town Center, Wilmington
- Southern Village and Meadowmont, Chapel Hill
- Trillium, Jackson County
- Vermillion, Huntersville

=== Oklahoma ===
- Selah, Norman
- Wheeler District, Oklahoma City
- Carlton Landing, Eufaula
- Harlow, Tulsa

=== Ohio ===
- Arena District, Columbus
- Creekside Gahanna, Gahanna
- Easton Town Center, Columbus
- Jeffrey Place, Columbus
- Jerome Village, Dublin
- New Haven, Barberton
- South Campus Gateway, Columbus
- The Greene, Beavercreek

=== Oregon ===
- Fairview Village, Fairview
- Hoyt Street Yards, Pearl District, Portland
- New Columbia, Portland
- Northwest Crossing, Bend
- Orenco Station, Hillsboro
- Pringle Creek Community, Salem
- South Waterfront, Portland
- South Hillsboro, Hillsboro
- Villebois, Wilsonville

=== Pennsylvania ===
- Black Horse, Gettysburg
- Crawford Square, Pittsburgh
- SouthSide Works, Pittsburgh
- Summerset at Frick Park, Pittsburgh
- Walden Crossroads, Mechanicsburg

=== South Carolina ===
- Baxter Village outside Fort Mill
- Celadon on Lady's Island, Beaufort
- Griffin Park, Greenville
- Habersham, Beaufort
- I'On Village, Mt. Pleasant
- Lake Carolina, Columbia
- Morris Square, Charleston
- The Market Common, Myrtle Beach

=== Tennessee ===
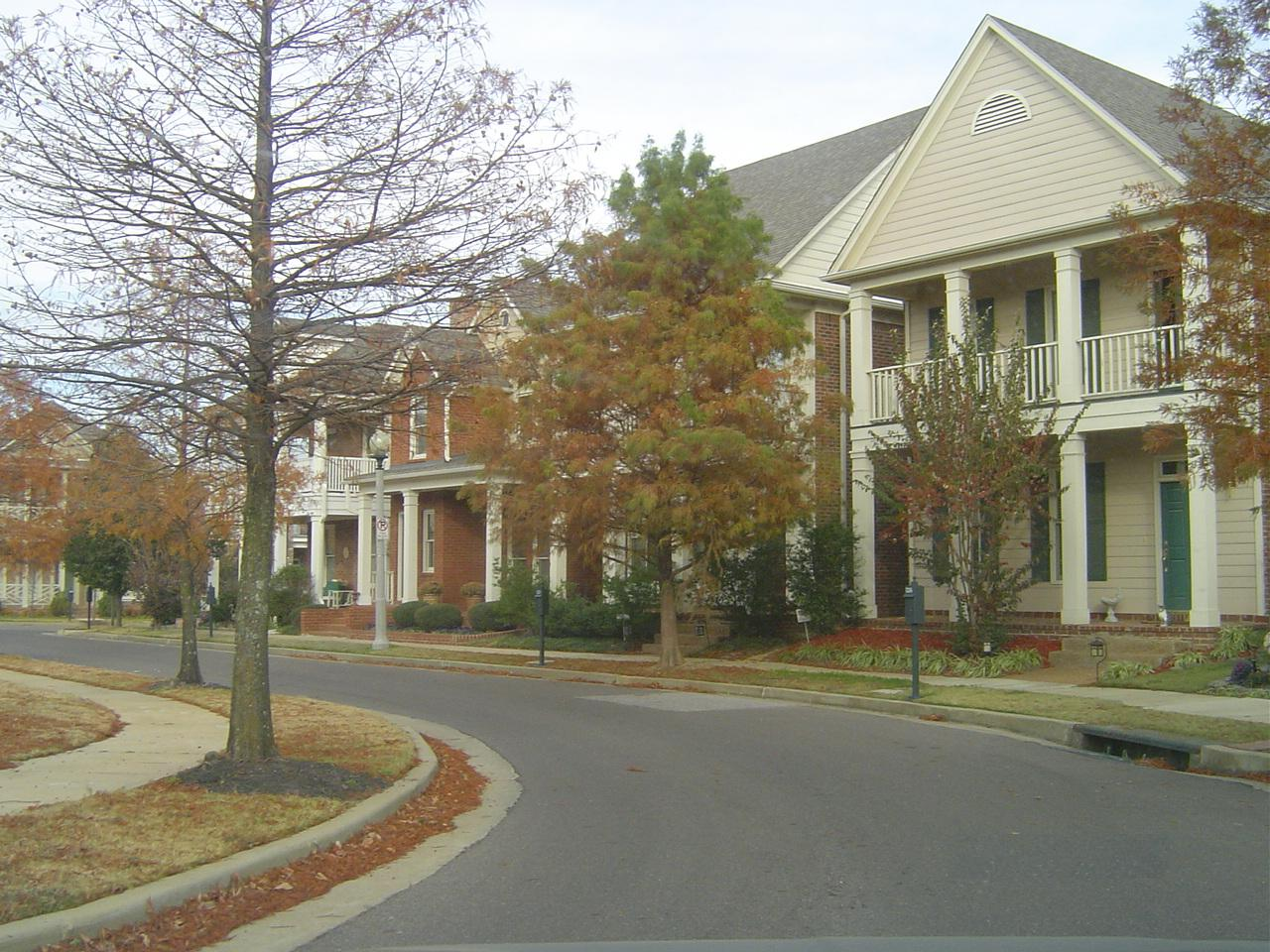
Chapel Park Boulevard, Cordova the Town, Shelby County, Tennessee

- Cordova the Town, Shelby County
- Harbor Town, Memphis
- Lakeland Green, Lakeland, a northeastern suburb of Memphis
- Northshore Town Center, the western area of Knoxville
- South Bluffs, Memphis
- Westhaven, Franklin, a southern suburb of Nashville

=== Texas ===
- Addison Circle, Addison
- Beachtown, Galveston
- Austin Ranch, The Colony
- BLVD Place, Houston
- Cinnamon Shore, Port Aransas
- Craig Ranch, McKinney
- Firewheel Town Center, Garland
- La Centerra, Katy
- Legacy Town Center, Plano
- Plum Creek, Kyle
- Lexington Park, the Downtown Plano Transit Village, Plano
- Mueller, Austin
- Palmilla Beach, Port Aransas
- Parker Square, Flower Mound
- Regent Square, Houston
- River Oaks District, Houston
- Southlake Town Square, Southlake
- Sugar Land Town Square, Sugar Land
- Sunflower Beach, Port Aransas
- The Woodlands Market Center, The Woodlands
- West Village and Uptown, Dallas

=== Utah ===
- Daybreak, South Jordan
- Elim Valley, Hurricane

=== Virginia ===
- Belmont Forest, Loudoun County
- Haymount, Caroline County
- Ladysmith Village
- Leeland Station, Fredericksburg
- The Mosaic District, Fairfax County
- New Post, Spotsylvania County
- Rocketts Landing, Richmond, Virginia
- West Broad Village, Henrico County
- One Loudoun, Loudoun County
- East Beach, Norfolk, Virginia
- Old Trail, Crozet

=== Washington State ===
- Cascadia, Bonney Lake
- High Point, Seattle
- Issaquah Highlands, Issaquah
- NewHolly/Othello Station, Seattle
- Northwest Landing, DuPont
- Seabrook, Grays Harbor County
- The Lookout, Chelan

=== Wisconsin ===
- Bayshore Town Square, Milwaukee
- Beerline B, Milwaukee
- Grandview Commons, Madison
- Liberty Square, Sun Prairie
- Middleton Hills, Middleton
- Providence, Sun Prairie
- Smiths Crossing, Sun Prairie
- The Uplands, Sun Prairie
- The Village at Autumn Lake, Madison

=== West Virginia ===
- Barboursville
