= Gabriele Tagliaventi =

Italian architect

Gabriele Tagliaventi (born 1960 in Bologna, Italy) is an Italian architect, associated with the European Urban Renaissance and New Urbanism movements in Europe.

== Biography ==
Tagliaventi was coordinator of the EU Program on medium-sized cities from 1993 to 1996 and visiting professor at the University of Miami School of Architecture from 1995 to 1997. Authors of various projects of architecture and town-planning, has received the 1st Prize at the International Competition for the Reconstruction of the Laeken Street in Brussels (1989), one of the five 1st Prizes at the International Competition for the Reconstruction of the Warsaw City Core (1992), the 1st Prize at the International Competition for the Reconstruction of the Marsham Street area in London (1996).

== Main Works ==
- Borgo Città Nuova, urban complex in Alessandria, Italy, with Léon Krier.
- Il Piombetto, urban complex in Valenza, Italy, with Léon Krier.

== Publications ==
- September 1992, (with Liam O'Connor) "A Vision of Europe. International Exhibition of Architecture and Urbanism", catalogue of the Bologna Triennale I of Architecture and Urbanism, Alinea Editions, Firenze
- March 1994, "Garden Cities", Gangemi Editions, Roma
- March 1996, "Urban Renaissance", catalogue of the Bologna Triennale II of Architecture and Urbanism, Grafis Editions, Bologna
- March 2000, "The Other Modern 1900–2000. Classical and Traditional Architectures in the Construction of the 20th century city", Dogma Editrice, Savona
- October 2000, "Tecniche e Tecnologie dell'Architettura tra Eclettismo e Storicismo", Alinea Editore, Firenze
- June 2002, “New Urbanism”, A&C Documents N.1, Alinea Editrice, Firenze
- October 2004, “New Civic Architecture. The Ecological Alternative to Sub-Urbanization”, Alinea Editrice, Firenze
- January 2007, “Manuale di Architettura Urbana”, Pàtron Editore, Bologna 2007
