= The Architecture of Community =

2009 book by Léon Krier

- Author: Léon Krier
- Illustrator: Léon Krier
- Language: English
- Subject: architecture; urban planning
- Publisher: Island Press
- Publication date: 2009
- Publication place: United States
- Pages: 459
- ISBN: 978-1-59726-578-2

The Architecture of Community is a 2009 book by the Luxembourgish architect and architectural theorist Léon Krier. Significant parts of the content had appeared in Krier's shorter book Architecture: Choice or Fate, first published in 1995.

== Summary ==
Léon Krier (1946–2025), a Luxembourgish architect and architectural theorist, criticises contemporary architecture and urban planning for being held captive by what he regards as failed ideologies and incentives that create car-dependent urban wastelands. He argues for the viability in choosing to reclaim enduring building techniques that have been developed as part of a natural human legacy. The book is illustrated by Krier's polemical drawings and a selection of his projects from a period of 40 years.

== Publication ==
Architecture: Choice or Fate
- Publication date: 1995
- English publication date: 1998
- Pages: 157
- ISBN: 8842047503

A book by Krier that contains significant portions of the content was first published in Italian by Laterza in 1995 as Architettura. Scelta o fatalità, and in English by Andreas Papadakis Publisher in 1998 as Architecture: Choice or Fate. The material was revised, expanded and published as The Architecture of Community by Island Press in 2009.

== Reception ==
Witold Rybczynski of The Washington Post called Architecture: Choice or Fate a "spirited critique of modernism". Reviewing The Architecture of Community for the London Review of Books, Deyan Sudjic identified consumerism and modernism as Krier's principal enemies. He described a significant change in Krier's attitude, as he is the past argued that principled architects cannot engage in actual building in a time when the European city is being dismantled, whereas in The Architecture of Community, Krier says the world is ready for change and gives practical advice for current architects and urban planners, separating the chronological modern from the ideological modernist. Sudjic wrote that Krier "flavours his text with invective" and makes the book "palatable" with his "sometimes hauntingly beautiful, sometimes dazzlingly witty drawings".

According to Stephan Trüby, professor of architecture at the University of Stuttgart, the book contains racism of a type typical for a new right that has "learned to speak in euphemisms, in disguise". Krier contested this.

== See also ==
- Drawing for Architecture, a collection of Krier's polemical drawings
- European Urban Renaissance
- New Urbanism
