= K. Michael Hays =

American architect

- Born: October 18, 1952 (age 73)
- Education: Georgia Institute of Technology; Massachusetts Institute of Technology
- Occupation: Professor
- Employer: Harvard University
- Spouse: Martha Ann Pilgreen
- Children: Henry
- Website: https://www.kmichaelhays.com/

Kenneth Michael Hays (born October 18, 1952) is an American architectural historian and professor. He currently serves as Eliot Noyes Professor of Architectural Theory at Harvard University's Graduate School of Design. He is also co-director of the school's doctoral programs, namely Ph.D and DDes or Doctor of Design.

== Education ==
Hays received his B.Arch degree from the Georgia Institute of Technology in 1976. He then went on to the Massachusetts Institute of Technology's School of Architecture and Planning, where he received his M.Arch in Advanced Studies in the History and Theory of Architecture in 1979. His dissertation was entitled Reference, Coherence, Meaning: A Realist Epistemology of Art under the direction of Henry A. Millon. In 1990, he completed his Ph.D program at MIT School of Architecture and Planning in the History, Theory, and Criticism of Architecture and Art. His main focus of study was European Modernism and his minor field was critical theory. His dissertation was advised by Stanford Anderson and he wrote on Modernism and the Posthumanist Subject: The Architecture of Hannes Meyer and Ludwig Hilberseimer, which he later published into a book of the same title.

== Personal life ==
Hays resides in Boston, Massachusetts with his wife, Martha Pilgreen, who is also an architect and president of Perry Dean Rogers Architects. They have one son, Henry.

== Works ==
- Modernism and the Posthumanist Subject: The Architecture of Hannes Meyer and Ludwig Hilberseimer (1992) ISBN 0874271290
- Unprecedented Realism: The Architecture of Machado and Silvetti (1995) ISBN 1568980035
- Hejduk's Chronotope (1996) ISBN 1568980787
- Oppositions Reader: Selected Essays 1973-1984 (1998) ISBN 1568981538
- Architecture Theory Since 1968 (2000) ISBN 0262581884
- Introduction of The Singular Objects of Architecture (by Jean Baudrillard and Jean Nouvel) (2002) ISBN 0816639124
- Sanctuaries: The Last Works of John Hejduk, with Maxwell L. Anderson, John Hejduk, Toshiko Mori (2002) ISBN 0874271290
- Scanning: The Aberrant Architectures of Diller + Scofidio, with Aaron Betsky and Laurie Anderson (2003) ISBN 0874271312
- Tschumi, with Giovanni Damiani and Marco De Michelis (2003) ISBN 0789308916
- Buckminster Fuller: Starting with the Universe, with Dana A. Miller (2008) ISBN 0300126204
- Architecture's Desire: Reading the Late Avant-Garde (2010) ISBN 9780262513029
- Constructing a New Agenda: Architectural Theory 1993-2009 (2010) ISBN 1568988591
- Log 22, with numerous authors (2010) ISBN 0983649103
