= Agrihood =

Planned community that integrates agriculture and residential uses

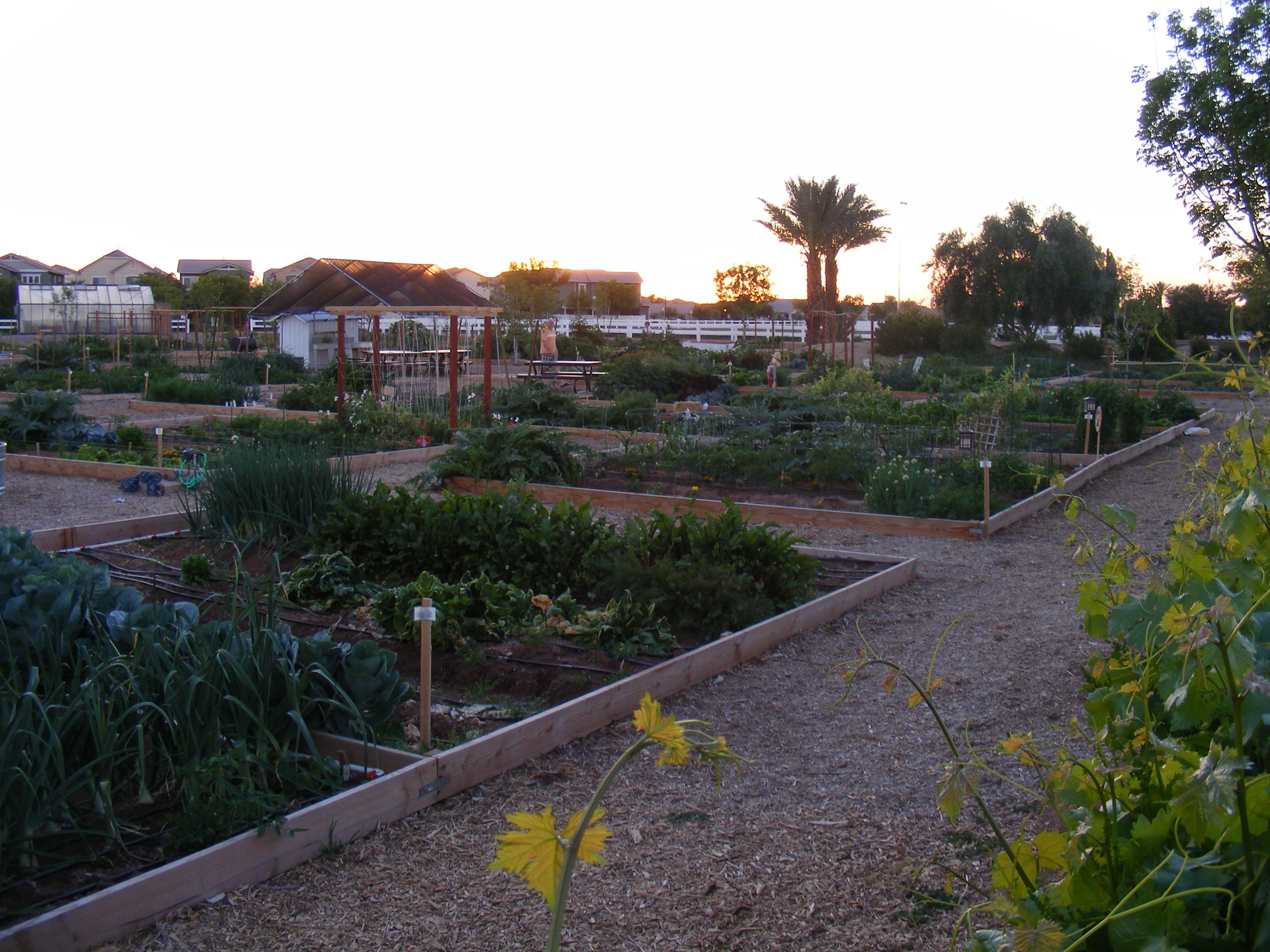
Agritopia, an agrihood in Gilbert, Arizona

An agrihood is a type of planned community that integrates agriculture into a residential neighborhood. The purpose is to facilitate food production as well as provide green space, recreation, aesthetics and value for a community.

The Urban Land Institute defines agrihoods as "single-family, multifamily, or mixed-use communities built with a working farm or community garden as a focus."

The earliest use of the term "agri-hood" was back in 2009 by Dr Alec Thornton, in a journal article "Garden of Eden? The impact of resettlement on squatters' 'agri-hoods' in Fiji", which explores the rise of food gardens in low-income settlements in Fiji. In 2014, "agrihood" was adopted by Southern California-based development company Rancho Mission Viejo LLC as a marketing trademark to target affluent millennials who wanted housing closer to fresh food.

Agrihoods are based around the concept of integrating farms and gardens into neighborhoods, allowing for the development of residential neighborhoods that have a rural feel. Integrating agriculture into neighborhoods also allows for communities to supply themselves with locally produced food.

Real estate developers may find that introducing agriculture to their planned communities has a lower initial cost than typically offered amenities such as golf courses or swimming pools, and sets the development apart from the competition. However, developers have also discovered that running an agricultural project is not necessarily easy, inexpensive or risk-free. The best results have come from hiring agricultural staff to run the operations, rather than allowing residents free-access and free-roam of the operation.

As of May 2020, there were 90 agrihoods in the United States according to the Urban Land Institute.

There are over 100 agrihoods in the United States according to Building the Agrihood.

== Urban agrihood ==
Some community gardens in established urban neighborhoods and urban agricultural projects have used the term "agrihood" to describe their operations. Their purposes are to reduce food insecurity and to provide fresh food resources in urban food deserts.
