= The New Faubourg Lafitte =

Coordinates: 29.966°N 90.080°W

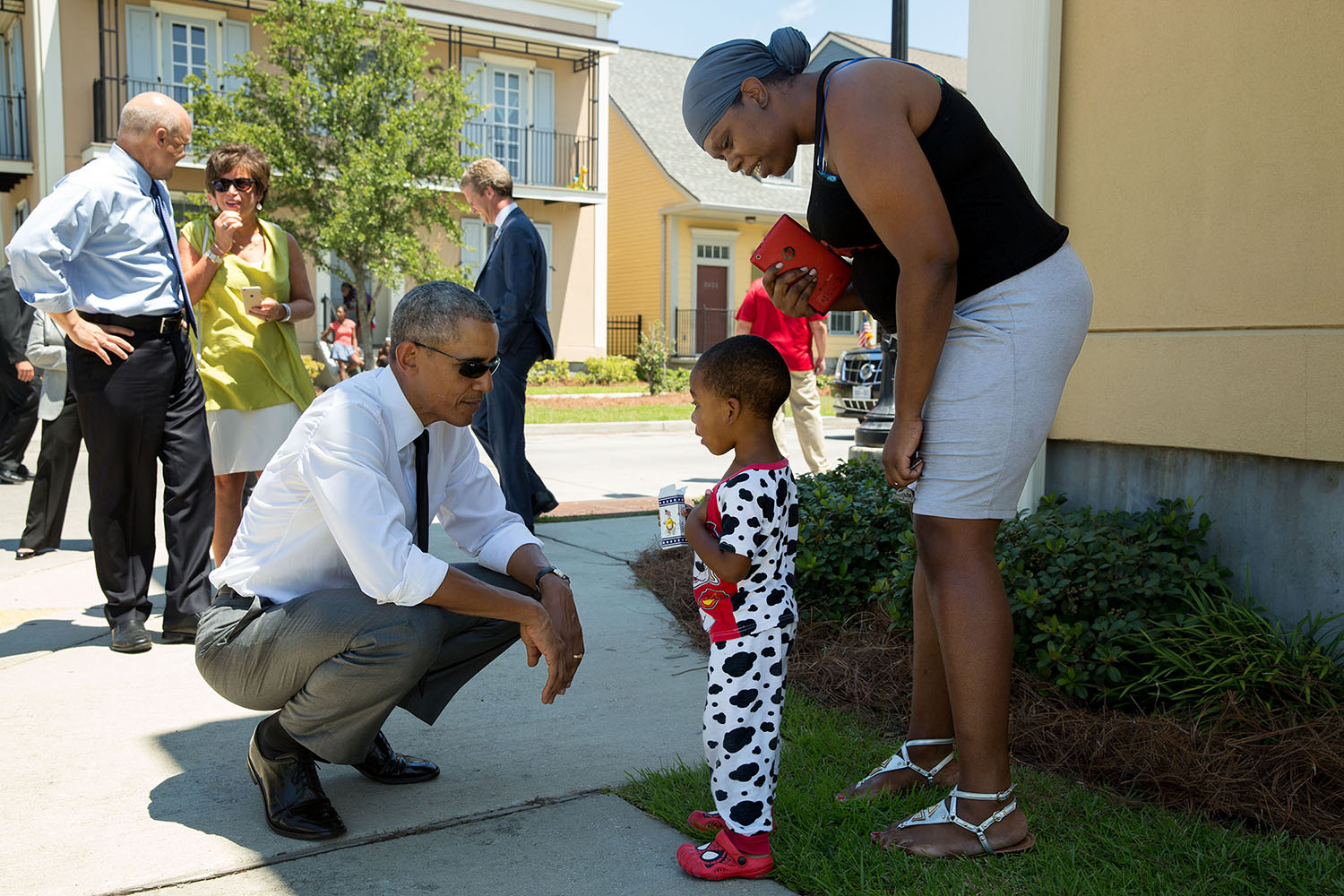
President Obama chats with a young resident of New Faubourg Lafitte during his August 2015 visit to New Orleans.

New Faubourg Lafitte is a residential development in New Orleans, Louisiana, U.S. It largely occupies the area formerly filled by the since demolished Lafitte Projects public housing.

In 2011, the first homes were constructed on a 27-acre site between the Tremé/Lafitte and Tulane-Gravier neighborhoods of New Orleans. The project includes the replacement of subsidized housing from the old Lafitte housing project with affordable new homes on a redeveloped site, as well as the addition of 900-1000 units that will be constructed on infill lots in adjacent neighborhoods. The homes range in size and cost, and 600 new units will be for sale for working families and first-time homeowners. The new construction reflects the character of the existing communities, and is a result of the mobilization of a spirited local residential council in response to a HUD mandate that their homes be demolished in the wake of two devastating hurricanes.

This project exemplifies local groups taking action, the preservation of cultural character, and the pursuit of environmental justice in a city that is rebuilding from the ground up in the wake of disaster.

== History ==
=== History of the Tremé neighborhood ===
The Carondolet Canal (since filled in) formerly was a barrier marking the upriver boundary of the Tremé section of New Orleans. The area formerly occupied by the canal and multiple railroad tracks has been repurposed as a linear park, the Lafitte Greenway. It is one of the oldest neighborhoods in the city, and has a rich and dynamic past. Historically, its residents were primarily free people of color; today, it remains an important core of the city's African-American and Créole cultures. The original "Old Treme" ran from Rampart to Claiborne; additional area lakewards from Claiborne is sometimes considered "New Treme" (dating from later in the 19th century). It has long been known as one of the city's centers of musical culture.

" Tremé/Lafitte" is a comparatively recent designation by the New Orleans City Planning Commission; a sub-district of the Mid-City District of New Orleans, and is bounded by Esplanade Avenue to the north, St. Louis Street to the south, North Rampart Street to the east and North Broad Street to the west.

Numbering among the cultural landmarks in the area are institutions like the New Orleans African American Museum, the Mahalia Jackson Theatre and Armstrong Park. It is home to the Zulu Social and Pleasure Club and the Mardi Super Krewe.

=== Hurricane damage: Both tangible and intangible ===
In August 2005, Hurricane Katrina struck the Gulf Coast, and was followed in September by a second hurricane of the same caliber, Hurricane Rita. The severity of the physical damage was exacerbated by the comparable damage to the political and social infrastructure. Hurricane Katrina brought about a terrible loss of life, and many who did not lose their lives still suffered devastating blows to their homes and livelihoods; it was perhaps the deadliest natural disaster in the US since 1928, and the most expensive in the country's history. While the active 2005 Atlantic hurricane season has raised ecological questions about the impact of climate change on tropical cyclones, Hurricane Katrina has elicited further inquiries of a more political nature. Such disastrous results despite adequate warnings from the US National Hurricane Center led to concerns about complex socio-economic issues. Two factors ultimately influence vulnerability to hurricanes: event incidence and societal infrastructure. While one is the product of nature, the other is totally within the control of man and consequently subject to its due scrutiny.

More than a million people were displaced by the storm, and consequently both public sector institutions and private sector relief organizations were unable to match the high level of need. The strain was felt socially and culturally, as people were removed from their communities and separated from their households and extended families. Ethnic tensions, too, surfaced to a greater degree. Because of the failure of public authorities to adequately prepare for the disaster, poor, predominantly Black communities ultimately bore the brunt of the damages. Furthermore, recovery policies in many ways reinforced discriminatory practices, and the city's poor black residents were often not seen as having a place in the "new" New Orleans that officials hoped would rise from the blank slate left in Katrina's wake.

In many instances, public authorities have not only failed to rebuild homes in some of the city's most disadvantaged neighborhoods, but policies adopted by such organizations as HANO and HUD have seemingly been purposefully designed to prevent members of poor communities from returning home. The availability in New Orleans of affordable housing, which was not adequate before Hurricane Katrina, was greatly reduced by the storm. 142,000 housing units were damaged by the hurricane, and of those, 112,000 (79%) were officially considered affordable for low-income residents. In 2008, three years after the storm, only 8,900 affordable housing units had been funded for redevelopment. Additionally, HANO, with the support of HUD, instituted a campaign of systematically demolishing public housing projects that survived the hurricane in conditions that were relatively intact. This purposeful destruction of homes on top of the already great losses caused by the hurricane was costly in both social and monetary senses. The thousands of units that were demolished (at price tag of well over $700 million) were to be replaced by mixed-income housing, to be put up at an additional cost.

This inequity against poor communities violates a myriad of human rights principles, including environmental protection, health, and education rights. It is, in particular, a violation of the right to housing that exists even in international law, and acknowledges the fundamental need for safety and security that all people have. This right to housing extends beyond simply four walls and a roof that protect one from the elements; it implies a need for the connections that people make to a place and to each other within a community. In addition to losing their homes and communities, many of the city's poor residents, and in particular those who lived in public housing, were excluded from the decision-making process with respect to rebuilding; they have had few opportunities to participate in decisions in which they are necessarily very much invested any tangible or meaningful way.

== The New Faubourg Lafitte Project ==
=== Goals and guiding principles for the New Faubourg Lafitte Project ===
The development of the new Faubourg Lafitte neighborhood stands contrary to many of the impediments to achieving balanced and appropriate redevelopment in the city. One major goal for the project was a one-for-one replacement of each pre-Katrina subsidized apartment with a comparable apartment in the same community. This would be done with a guaranteed opportunity for former Lafitte residents to return to their neighborhood. The design team also hoped to engage the residents in active participation so that they could make meaningful contributions to the planning process for the redevelopment. Also included in the goals for the projects is the provision of community supportive services for all residents. Thus far, counseling and direct assistance has been provided for hundreds of former Lafitte families living both locally and across the country.

The project was planned with safety in mind. The integral public spaces are both clearly defined and overlooked by housing so as to promote security. The houses feature porches and large windows, which, while also being architecturally consistent with the character of the neighborhood, also provide a sense of residents being able to watch the street. There is even a type of sentinel building that was designed to flank the lane access to parking that occurs within the blocks to provide an additional sense of security in the semi-private areas.

In terms of sustainability, the project is designed to meet Enterprise Green Communities criteria. This is the only national standard for green affordable housing in the country. Lighting and ventilation adhere to the strict energy efficient standards for wall assemblies and HVAC systems, and all homes and apartments feature Energy Star appliances.

The project team also looked to adhere to a number of charter principles from the Congress for New Urbanism. These include (among many others):
13. Within neighborhoods, a broad range of housing types and price levels can bring people of diverse ages, races, and incomes into daily interaction.
16. Concentrations of civic, institutional, and commercial activity should be embedded in neighborhoods and districts.
21. The revitalization of urban places depends on safety and security. The design of streets and buildings should reinforce safe environments, but not at the expense of accessibility and openness.
26. All buildings should provide their inhabitants with a clear sense of location, weather, and time.
27. Preservation and renewal of historic buildings, districts, and landscapes which affirm the continuity and evolution of urban society.

These goals for New Urbanism were achieve through design decisions like the retention of trees and the reuse of some historic structures as civic buildings (27), or the inclusion of affordable and subsidized housing, and plans for a senior building to be erected in the next phase of development (13).

The amenities described for the housing units also fall neatly in line with these goals. They include spacious, open floors, Energy Star appliances, (including refrigerators, dishwashers, washers, and dryers), energy efficient central heat and air conditioning, off-street parking, front porches, balconies, back yards, community gardens, extensive landscaping, 100 year oaks, proximity to the Lafitte Greenway.

=== A collaborative effort ===
A particularly impassioned residential council has been instrumental in the redevelopment effort and level of community involvement; they perpetuated an attitude of hope and the belief that a better home - and consequently a better life - was possible. After five years, during which time the wills of residents, federal mandates, advocacy groups, and preservation and design politics aligned, the first homes have been constructed.

The project was generated in collaboration with the residents, and their needs, and their input were taken into consideration on many levels. Project manager Don Kaliszewski said that the planning of the new Faubourg Lafitte was informed by meetings with former Lafitte residents in New Orleans, Atlanta, and Houston. He recalled that the residents expressed desires to live in "houses," not "buildings," and that in particular they were more inclined towards the types of detached houses that are found surrounding the 6th Ward neighborhood. The residents talked about the significance of community, and shared their fond childhood memories of walking down streets lined with houses with large windows and porches where they felt safe because they were among people they knew. The streets of these memories were lost to housing projects that were made up of super-block and that had internal greens and little street frontage.

During the design process, members of the community were invited to join the charettes, and even some children attended with their parents. Magic Street, a green feature that spans the entire site, is so named because it honors the hope seen by the children whose drawings served as the basis for its inspiration. Plans and elevations were developed for various housing types, and then large-scale versions were pinned to a gymnasium wall where neighborhood participants were asked to place green dots on the housing types they liked, and red dots on those that they disliked. Single and double houses received the most green dots, and the drawings for proposed shot-guns and long rows of attached houses and apartments were less desirable to the residents. Additionally, the houses that resembled the traditional houses in Tremé received green dots, while those that seemed out of character (because they were either avant-garde or non-Tremé styles) received red dots. In this way, the people who were the most invested in the outcome of the project, in a more substantial way than public authorities, anonymous federal agencies, or even the designers, were given a say in shaping the neighborhood. They were also the possessors of unique insights into the problems and solutions for the neighborhood, and their input would certainly help to create a more successful project for all parties involved. One example of this is that a concern about safe parking expressed in charettes led to the creation of blocks with interior parking courts. These courts - which became elevated above grade in the design - were integrated into solutions to the requirements by FEMA for entrances to be up to four feet above ground level, a mandate which had posed challenges in designing with respect to accessibility.

=== Architectural character ===
While the buildings are unmistakably new, every effort was made to create a seamless continuity with the existing character of the place that is so integral a reflection of its rich culture and history; the buildings are made to look as if they had always been there. A myriad of colors, historic details, and building orientations are used to suggest organic growth of the neighborhood. Elements such as arched neoclassical pediments and paired columns on the porches additionally imply that the neighborhood has historic ties. After a careful study of the architectural patterns that exist in the area, characteristic features that were strategically used in the new buildings included tall windows, narrow front porches, large cornices with brackets on the front facades, siding and a variety of colors.

The street plan has been restored to the original grid of circulating traffic, and the cul-de-sacs are being removed. The houses have the same relationship to the sidewalks as in Tremé: the porches are close to the sidewalk with small front gardens. In order to achieve a truer and more traditional neighborhood as opposed to another set of housing projects, the design incorporates a variety of building types. Each block makes use of a combination of types, which include double houses that look like large houses, single camelback houses and double camelback houses, cottages, and small apartment buildings that are similar in appearance to the grand houses on Esplanade Ave. Additionally, there is a focus in the plan of development around existing schools, emphasizing education as a means of emphasizing their integral role within a strong the community.

=== Development and funding ===
The developers for the project are Providence Community Housing, Enterprise Community Partners, and L&M Development. The master plan for the neighborhood was designed by Urban Design Associates of Pittsburgh. The budget for the first phase of the project, which included 134 units, was $32 million, and the units average between 740 and 1,470 square feet.

The Lafitte redevelopment project is being financed by a myriad of sources. Funding comes from a combination of low-income housing tax credits provided by the Louisiana Housing Finance Agency, community development block grant funds from the Louisiana Office of Community Development, HUD capital grant dollars, and additional public and private sources. Goldman Sachs and Iberiabank have become the primary construction lenders for the redevelopment project.

=== Reception ===
The New York Times Editorial Board wrote that "the Lafitte design shows that it is possible to satisfy the need to replace destroyed public housing and to create vibrant new communities of mixed incomes." From a more local perspective, New Orleans architect Steve Bingler, a consultant on the Iberbeille redesign project and a contributor to Brad Pitt's Make It Right development in the Lower 9th Ward, offered a hopeful commentary about the projects. While he asserted that it would be impossible to conclusively assess the project before its completion, it exhibited careful studies of nuanced archetypes and avoided mere cartoons of them. The architectural styles of the Make It Right houses in no way try to imitate the character of the buildings around them, but Bingler conceded that if one is going to make a copy of something, it is best to do it as authentically as possible.

The project has also received some more critical responses. Even some residents have expressed skepticism because of what they had heard about a discrepancy that can exist between what New Urbanists plan to do and what they actually do. They also found something unnatural about a place being planned all at once.

=== The role of New Urbanism ===
New Urbanism seeks to redress the economic, environmental and social costs of urban sprawl. It is about reviving traditional typologies and patterns, and creating a balance of land uses, household types, building and architectural types, and socioeconomic and age groups. Its governing ideals include the promotion of walking, bicycling, and public transportation through a cohesive network of streets, paths, greenways, and waterways, and the creation of denser, clearly bounded communities that preserve open spaces and natural systems. These principles also look to strengthen the public realm by encouraging and facilitating interaction between people. Additionally, its principles promote diversity within a community, rather than separation based on socioeconomic factors. While city planning is such a dynamic and intricate undertaking that it is hard to ensure success, New Urbanism is based on principles that promote strong communities. The implications of this on social and political spheres, as well as on health, education and happiness can be great.
