= Architecture's Desire =

2010 book by K. Michael Hays

Architecture's Desire: Reading the Late Avant-Garde
- Author: K. Michael Hays
- Language: English
- Series: Writing Architecture
- Genre: Non-fiction
- Publisher: MIT Press
- Publication date: 2010
- Publication place: United States

Architecture's Desire: Reading the Late Avant-Garde (2010) is a book written by American architecture theorist K. Michael Hays, published by MIT Press.

The book has been reviewed by Mark Linder in Journal of Architectural Education; Peggy Deamer in The Journal of Architecture,; and Sarah Butler in Journal of Design History.

== See also ==
- Drawing for Architecture
