= Frank E. Bolden =

American journalist

Franklin Eugene Bolden, Jr., was an American journalist best known for his work as a war correspondent during World War II when he was one of only two accredited African American war correspondents.

== Early life and education ==
Frank Bolden was born in Washington, Pennsylvania on December 24, 1912, the son of the city's first African American mail carrier. After graduating from Washington High School, Bolden attended the University of Pittsburgh, where he was the first African American member of the marching band. He joined Alpha Phi Alpha during his time at Pitt, and graduated in 1934 with a Bachelor of Science. Although he received high grades at Pitt, his application to University of Pittsburgh School of Medicine was denied on account of his race. Bolden was also rejected for a teaching position with Pittsburgh Public Schools, since they did not hire African American teachers at that time. In 1960, Bolden married Nancy Travis.

== Pittsburgh Courier ==
Bolden began as a stringer for the Pittsburgh Courier while he was still an undergraduate student at Pitt. He covered Pittsburgh sports for extra income during this time. After graduation, rather than moving to the South to teach, Bolden accepted a job with the Pittsburgh Courier as a general assignment reporter. In those years, much of his work focused on Wylie Avenue, which was the center of African American social life and culture in Pittsburgh at this time. For this coverage, he met famous musicians including Sarah Vaughan, Count Basie and Billy Eckstine. Bolden also wrote of the grittier side of Hill District life, saying “Wylie Avenue: the only street in America that begins with a church and ends with a jail," and referring to prostitutes as “sisterhood of the nocturnal order.” After World War II, Bolden refused job offers from Life Magazine and The New York Times, instead returning to work for the Pittsburgh Courier, which was the leading African American paper at that time. He was promoted to city editor in 1956 and left near the end of the paper's decline in 1962.

== War correspondent ==
Upon the United States' entrance into World War II, the editors of the Pittsburgh Courier nominated Bolden to be an official war correspondent, and because of his college degree, he was selected. Bolden and a New York City journalist, Edgar Rousseau, were the only two accredited black journalists. He travelled in Europe and Asia, covering the heroism and victories of African American troops, including the 92nd Infantry Division and soldiers working on the Burma Road. Bolden once told an interviewer: "White America was convinced that Negro soldiers under fire would be cowards and turn and run, that is why I went over." In 1945, his writing attracted the attention of Indian independence leader Mahatma Gandhi, who invited Bolden to visit him at his home, where Bolden stayed for two weeks. This prompted a similar offer from Jawaharlal Nehru, at whose home Bolden stayed for twelve days. Also in 1945, Bolden interviewed Franklin D. Roosevelt, Joseph Stalin, Winston Churchill, and Chiang Kai-shek.

== National journalism ==
After leaving the Courier, Bolden wrote for The New York Times as a general-assignment reporter. Next, he worked for NBC News, where he reported for The Today Show and The Huntley-Brinkley Report. In 1964, while in San Francisco covering the Republican National Convention for NBC, Bolden got an impromptu interview with Barry Goldwater. According to Bolden, while Goldwater did agree to the interview, he was a bigot and said, "I didn't know [news organizations] hired you people."

== Return to Pittsburgh ==
In 1964, Bolden returned to Pittsburgh to be the assistant director of information and community relations for the Pittsburgh Board of Education. He held that position until he retired in 1981. Bolden was also an unofficial historian of the African American community of Pittsburgh, leaving behind many interviews and research. Bolden died at age 90 on August 28, 2003.

== Frank E. Bolden Papers ==
The Archives Service Center at the University of Pittsburgh houses the Frank E. Bolden Papers. The collection dating from 1930 to 1967 contains documents his career as journalist, reporter and city editor of the Pittsburgh Courier and his war correspondence. Contents of the collection include: dating between 1930 and 1967, includes college and university class lecture notes and lab books, letters, drafts of newspaper articles, memos, photographs, and newspaper clippings.
