= Urban Design Associates =

Pennsylvanian Architectural firm

- Type: Private
- Industry: Community development Urban planning Urban design
- Founded: 1964; 62 years ago
- Founders: David Lewis, co-founder Ray Gindroz, co-founder
- Headquarters: Pittsburgh, Pennsylvania
- Number of employees: 20 (2016)
- Website: www.urbandesignassociates.com

Urban Design Associates (UDA; formerly known as UDA Architects) is an international urban design and architecture firm headquartered in Pittsburgh, Pennsylvania, United States.

== History ==
Urban Design Associates (UDA) was founded in 1964 by David Lewis, FAIA, and Raymond Gindroz, FAIA, as one of the earliest architecture firms to concentrate on the design of neighborhoods and cities. Lewis and Gindroz pioneered methods for engaging citizens in the design of community centers, schools, and neighborhoods.

The firm is known for refining and developing public planning process and authored The Urban Design Handbook, Techniques and Working Methods, a textbook published by W. W. Norton & Company. UDA has advanced urban design as an important branch of the architecture profession, and co-founder David Lewis was influential in creating the Regional Urban Design Assistance Team (R/UDAT) service of the American Institute of Architects, and organized the "Remaking Cities" conference that was held in Pittsburgh in 1988 to address post-industrial cities. UDA co-founder Ray Gindroz was also a founding member of the Congress for the New Urbanism and was influential in formulating policies and standards with the United States Department of Housing and Urban Development and the Congress for the New Urbanism for the design of mixed-income neighborhoods under the federal HOPE VI program. UDA has been recognized for resurrecting the pattern book as a regulatory design tool for developers and municipalities as indicated in The Architectural Pattern Book, A Tool for Building Great Neighborhoods. UDA-authored pattern books include Celebration, Florida, and WaterColor, Florida, in the United States, and Ellon, Aberdeenshire, in Scotland.

== Developments ==
The Urban Design Associates portfolio of work includes urban design, transit, and community development projects working with local and regional governmental authorities and private developers in North America, Europe, and Eurasia. Sample projects include:

- Alexander Street Corridor Design Guidelines, Yonkers, New York
- Anderson Station, Calgary, Alberta, Canada
- Baxter Village Pattern Book, Fort Mill, South Carolina
- Celebration Pattern Book, Celebration, Florida
- Cincinnati Central Riverfront, Ohio
- Clarksburg Municipal Building, Clarksburg, West Virginia
- Crawford Square, Pittsburgh, Pennsylvania
- Currie Barracks, Calgary, Alberta, Canada
- Daybreak, Utah: Master Planners, Pattern Book
- Dayton, Ohio (various parts of city)
- Diggs Town, Norfolk, Virginia
- Downtown Norfolk, Virginia
- Ellon Pattern Book, Aberdeenshire, Scotland, UK
- Federal District, Moscow, Russian Federation
- Jacksonville Landing, Jacksonville, Florida
- Louisiana Speaks: Pattern Book & Tool Kit, Louisiana Region
- Middletown Arch, Norfolk, Virginia
- The New Faubourg Lafitte, New Orleans, Louisiana
- Park DuValle, Louisville, Kentucky
- Randolph Neighborhood, Richmond, Virginia
- Sewickley Heights Pattern Book, Sewickley Heights, Pennsylvania
- Tampa Waterfront Vision Plan, Tampa, Florida
- Virginia Beach Form-Based Code, Virginia Beach, Virginia
- WaterColor Pattern Book, WaterColor, Florida
- West Don Lands, Toronto, Ontario, Canada
- Yuzhny Master Plan, St. Petersburg, Russian Federation

== Founders ==
- David Lewis, FAIA, co-founder - Lewis is credited for inspiring the Remaking Cities Institute (RCI) at Carnegie Mellon University. In 2007 the Heinz Endowments issued an endowment in his name.
- Raymond L. Gindroz, FAIA, co-founder - The "Gindroz Prize" for Carnegie Mellon architecture and music students carries his name.
- Donald K. Carter, FAIA, FAICP, LEED AP, emeritus key principal
- Paul B. Ostergaard, FAIA AoU, emeritus key principal
- Rob Robinson, AIA, emeritus key principal

== Key employees ==
- Megan O'Hara, AICP, LEED AP BD+C, Managing principal, CEO
- Barry J. Long Jr., AIA, LEED AP, Managing principal,President
- Eric R. Osth, AIA, LEED AP, Chairman

== Awards and recognitions ==
American Institute of Architects

- 1988, Edward C. Kemper Award, David Lewis
- 2014, Honor Award, Regional and Urban Design, East Baltimore Comprehensive Redevelopment Plan, Baltimore, Maryland
- 2000, Honor Award, Regional and Urban Design, Park DuValle, Louisville, Kentucky
- 1999, Honor Award, Regional and Urban Design, Diggs Town Public Housing, Norfolk, Virginia
- 2019, AIA Presidential Citation for Exceptional Service, David Lewis, FAIA, Urban Design Associates
- Citation For Excellence, Urban Design, Patching and Stitching in Urban Neighborhoods: Pittsburgh, Norfolk, and Richmond

Congress for the New Urbanism

- 2003, Charter Award, East Baltimore Comprehensive Redevelopment Plan, Baltimore, Maryland
- 2004, Charter Award, The Campus Plan for the University of California Santa Barbara, Santa Barbara, California
- 2005, Charter Award, A Pattern Book for Norfolk Neighborhoods, Norfolk, Virginia
- 2006, Athena Award, David Lewis
- 2007, Charter Awards, Louisiana Speaks: Pattern Book, State of Louisiana
- 2007, Recognition, Cooper's Crossing Pattern Book, Camden, New Jersey
- 2008, Recognition, A Pattern Book for Neighborly Houses/Habitat for Humanity
- 2012, Recognition, Neighborhoods of the Lower Mill Creek Valley, Cincinnati, Ohio
- 2012, Charter Award, New Faubourg Lafitte, New Orleans, Louisiana
- 2016, Charter Award (Merit Award), Currie, Calgary, Alberta, Canada
- 2016, Charter Award (Merit Award) Orleans Landing, Detroit, Michigan

Institute for Classical Architecture and Arts

- 2019, Arthur Ross Award for Community Design & City Planning

Presidential Design Award

- 1995, Federal Design Achievement Award, The Re-design of Diggs Town (Public Housing), Norfolk, Virginia

Urban Land Institute

- 2004, Award of Excellence, Fall Creek Place, Indianapolis, Indiana
- 2004, Award of Excellence, First Ward Place/ The Garden District, Charlotte, North Carolina
- 2004, Award of Excellence, WaterColor, Seagrove Beach, Florida
- 2017-2018, Global Award, West Don Lands, Toronto, Ontario, Canada

American Institute of Certified Planners (AICP)

- 2011, Donald Hunter Excellence in Economic Development Planning Award, Coliseum District Master Plan: Peninsula Town Center Project, Hampton, Virginia
- 2013, National Planning Excellence Award for Implementation, Cincinnati Central Riverfront, Master Plan, Cincinnati, Ohio

City of Moscow

- 2012, First Prize, Federal District Concept Plan, International Competition for the Moscow Agglomeration Plan

Toronto Architecture & Urban Design

- 2005, Award of Excellence, Visions and Master Plans, West Don Lands Precinct Plan, Toronto, Ontario, Canada

== See also ==
- New Urbanism
- Mixed-income housing
- HOPE VI
