= Louisiana Speaks =

Planning organization in Louisiana

Louisiana Speaks was a regional plan, published in May 2007, and planning organization for southern Louisiana created in the wake of the destruction caused by Hurricanes Katrina and Rita.

== About ==
The plan was conceived to guide the state of Louisiana and its citizens on a "bold new course" through the state's recovery from Katrina and Rita and "into a safer, stronger, smarter future".

The plan represented 18 months of work facilitated by some of the top planners in Louisiana and the United States, taking in input from 23,000 Louisianans and supported by $4 million in private funding. The plan combined the efforts of local, state, and federal partners along with many experts, stakeholders and citizens into a comprehensive approach in order to guide recovery and growth in the state of Louisiana over the next 50 years. The Regional Plan includes more than 100 action items, supporting three broad goals: Recover Sustainably, Grow Smarter, and Think Regionally.

Louisiana Speakswas funded by private donations to the Louisiana Recovery Authority Support Foundation, created by the Baton Rouge Area Foundation. The Center for Planning Excellence, a non-profit planning organization, managed the creation of the plan in cooperation with the Louisiana Recovery Authority.

The plan was credited with leading to changes in land use policy in the state.

== Process ==
The Louisiana Speaks process included:

1. Planning for individual homeowners and businesses through the development of a Pattern Book for residential and commercial architecture, and development of a guide to planning, the Toolkit, which is led by Urban Design Associates
2. Planning for neighborhoods through local design charrettes, which were led by Duany Plater-Zyberk & Company
3. Parish-level planning supported by Long-Term Community Recovery Teams, which were coordinated through the Louisiana Recovery Authority and the US Department of Homeland Security's Federal Emergency Management Agency
4. And long term 25-50 year regional plan for South Louisiana led by Calthorpe Associates

== Publications ==
- Louisiana Speaks Regional Plan
- Louisiana Speaks Planning Toolkit
- Louisiana Speaks Pattern Book
