= Alta de Lisboa =

Community in Portugal

Coordinates: 38.7736°N 9.1445°W

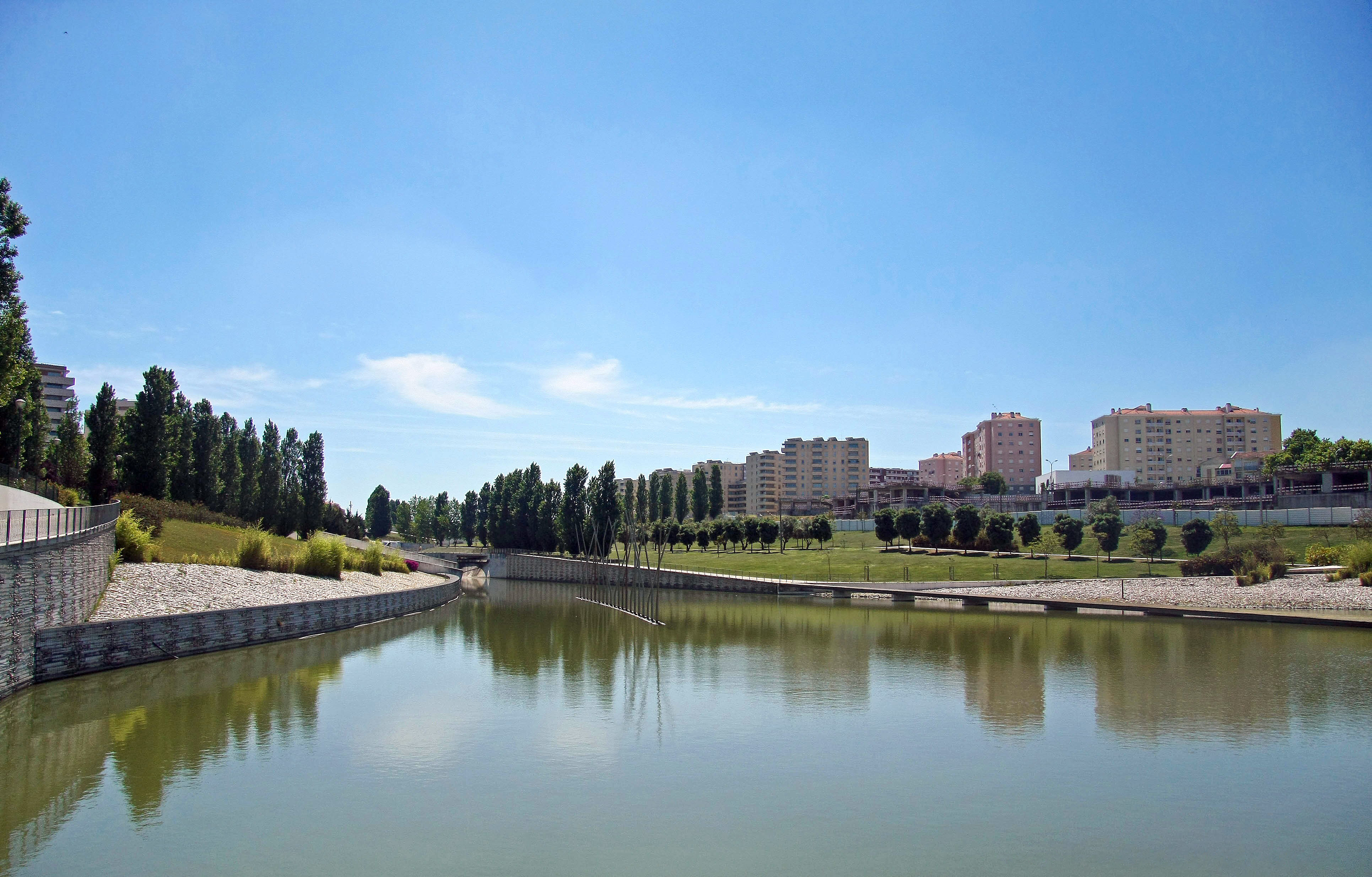
Park built in 2006 as part of the Alta de Lisboa Urbanization Plan

Alta de Lisboa (in English, uptown Lisbon) is a Portuguese community on the northern edge of Lisbon. The community covers an area of roughly 3 square kilometres (740 acres).

== Urban renewal ==
The community is the result of one of the largest urban renewal projects in Europe, encompassing an area of 300 hectares and with an original target population of close to 60,000 inhabitants. It is being developed by an international consortium known as Sociedade Gestora da Alta de Lisboa, or SGAL, in accordance with a public-private partnership agreement with the Municipality of Lisbon. The project, which involves an investment of approximately 200 million euros each year, was set for completion in 2015, but development has been hindered by periods of economic recession. Despite this, most of the street network is in place, as are a number of social facilities, and the promoter is expecting faster development in the coming years.
