= Agritopia =

Planned community in Maricopa County, Arizona

Coordinates: 33.3250°N 111.7225°W

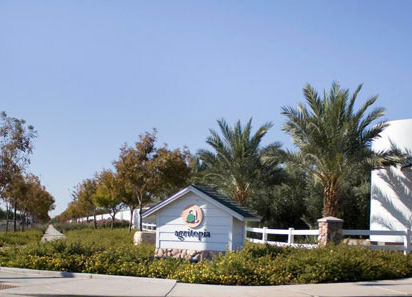
Agritopia sign

Agritopia is a 166-acre (67 ha) planned community in Gilbert, Maricopa County, Arizona. It is a mixed use community, designed with the intent of encouraging agrarianism and fostering community bonds in a mixed-income, mixed-density setting. It is a multi-zoned agrihood community with a USDA-certified organic farm and commercial spaces.

Located off of Arizona Loop 202, the development consists of several hundred single-family units alongside an assisted living facility, school, commercial spaces, and a functioning urban farm sustained by the community's members. The farm maintains a limited compilation of small-stock animals, an orchard, and a variety of different field crops.

== Neighborhood and history ==
The neighborhood was originally the Johnston family hay farm, purchased in 1960 by James Johnston. The rapid growth of the Phoenix suburbs led to the expansion of Arizona Loop 202, which cut the family's property in half. Over time, the family was pressed to sell the land. James' son Joe Johnston sought to re-develop the farm into a planned community after his father's retirement in the 1990s, as a means of "creating place" against the backdrop of Phoenix's urban sprawl. His family gave their blessing for Johnston to develop the land, and construction began in the early 2000s; the family home and tool shed were redeveloped into the restaurants "Joe's Farm Grill" and a coffee shop respectively. The family barn was converted to house multiple restaurants and businesses. Ground was broken for home construction in 2003.

Johnston's idea for the neighborhood arose from his experiences travelling internationally, wherein he came to appreciate the "tight-knit [...] welcoming spirit" of many of the communities he visited. He has described the mixed-use development style as "reminiscent of life in Europe, but in an 'American sort of way.'"

The community contains 452 lots on which the developer built single family homes, cottages and bungalows all in neotraditional architectural styles from the early 20th century United States based upon styles found in Arizona at that time (Spanish eclectic, American craftsman, Northern European revival, and ranch). The community also includes a functioning urban farm, a community garden, a private 470-student Christian school, a community center, a retirement home, four restaurants, as well as a brewery, florist, and letterpress. The developers established neighborhood covenants which encouraged home-based and agricultural businesses and the maximization of walkability and owner-occupancy. The community's 'kid-pod' allows parents to grant a relative degree of freedom to their children while keeping them secure inside an enclosed area, with one parent always being responsible for their guardianship and observation. Homes range from 1,300 square feet (120 m^{2}) to 7,000 square feet (650 m^{2}). Street and home designs are intended to encourage socialization among neighbors.

Joe's Farm Grill was featured on the Food Network show Diners, Drive-Ins and Dives hosted by Guy Fieri. Next door is The Coffee Shop, which won an episode of Food Network's Cupcake Wars.

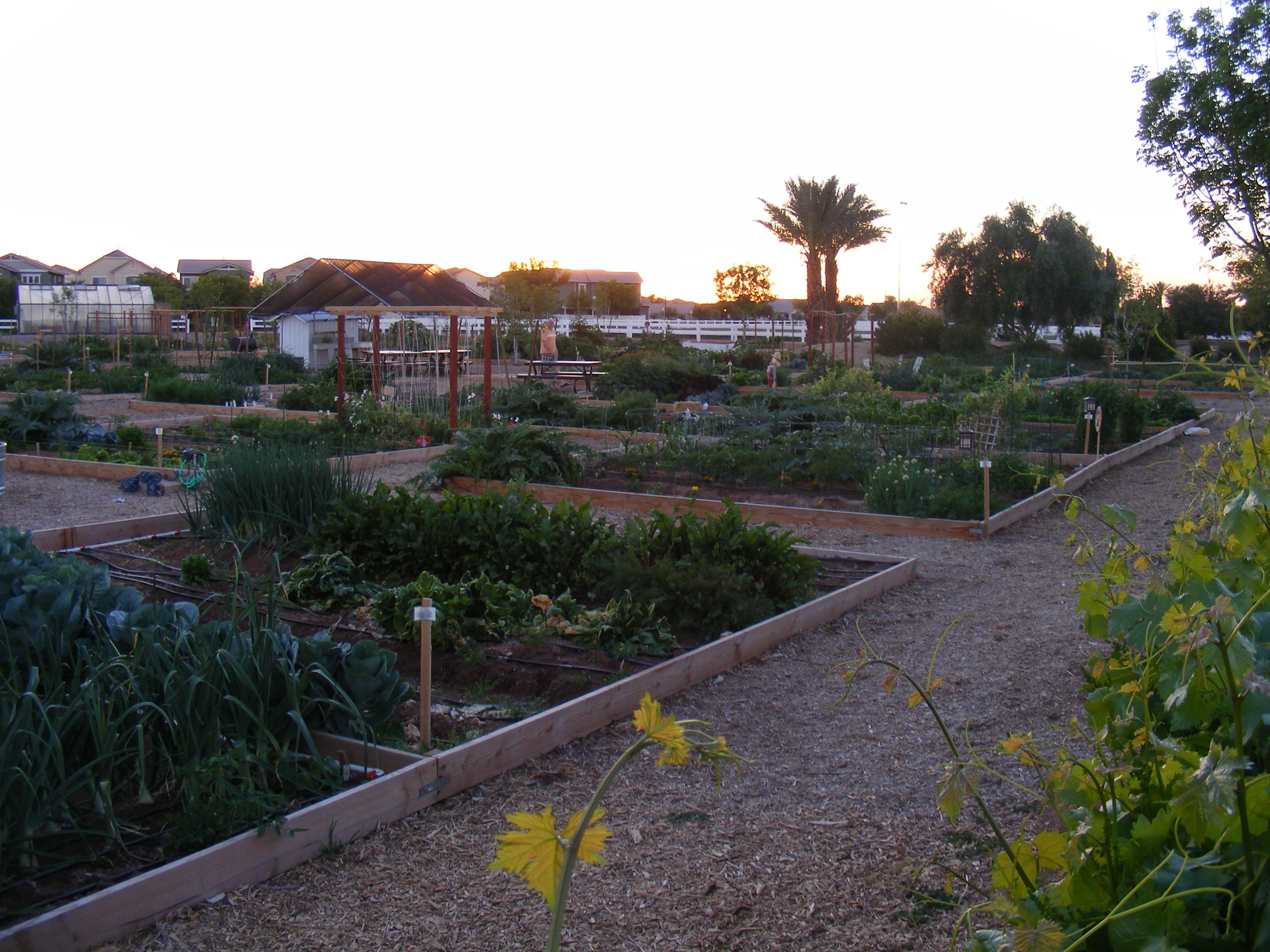
Gardening lots at Agritopia, April 2011

== Neighborhood farm ==
Joe Johnston claims that Agritopia farms have followed organic farming practices since its inception. Agritopia received USDA certification under the National Organic Program by 2014, and has maintained it as of 2025.

A variety of produce is grown by the community on a 12-acre plot, out of 16 acres of maintained farmland overall. Field crops are grown in a polyculture: crops include beets, cabbage, carrots, cauliflower, celery, cilantro, dill, fennel, garlic, kale, lettuce, onion, parsley, sugar snap and snow peas, potatoes, radishes, spinach, and Swiss chard. Fruit trees include apples, dates, grapefruit, lemons, mandarins, oranges, peaches, tangelos, and tangerines. The farm also has sheep and chickens.

== Commentary ==
Community farms, though popular among developers in the southern US as an amenities option for neighborhood residents in new listing zones, have been criticized for the role they play in driving gentrification in those same regions. Though the produce grown in Agritopia's farm lots is donated to a local food pantry and sold at a market in downtown Gilbert, low participation of the community's members in the neighborhood's "farm box" program, which grants them first pick of the harvest, has been noted by outside observers.
