= Saxony, Indiana =

Coordinates: 39°59′24″N 85°55′48″W

Saxony is a 750-acre (300 ha) mixed-use New Urbanism development in the northeast of Indianapolis. It is bordered by Noblesville and Fishers, Indiana in Hamilton County. Republic Development, an Ohio-based developer, launched Saxony in 2001.
