= Léon Krier =

Luxembourgish architect (1946–2025)

Léon Krier CVO
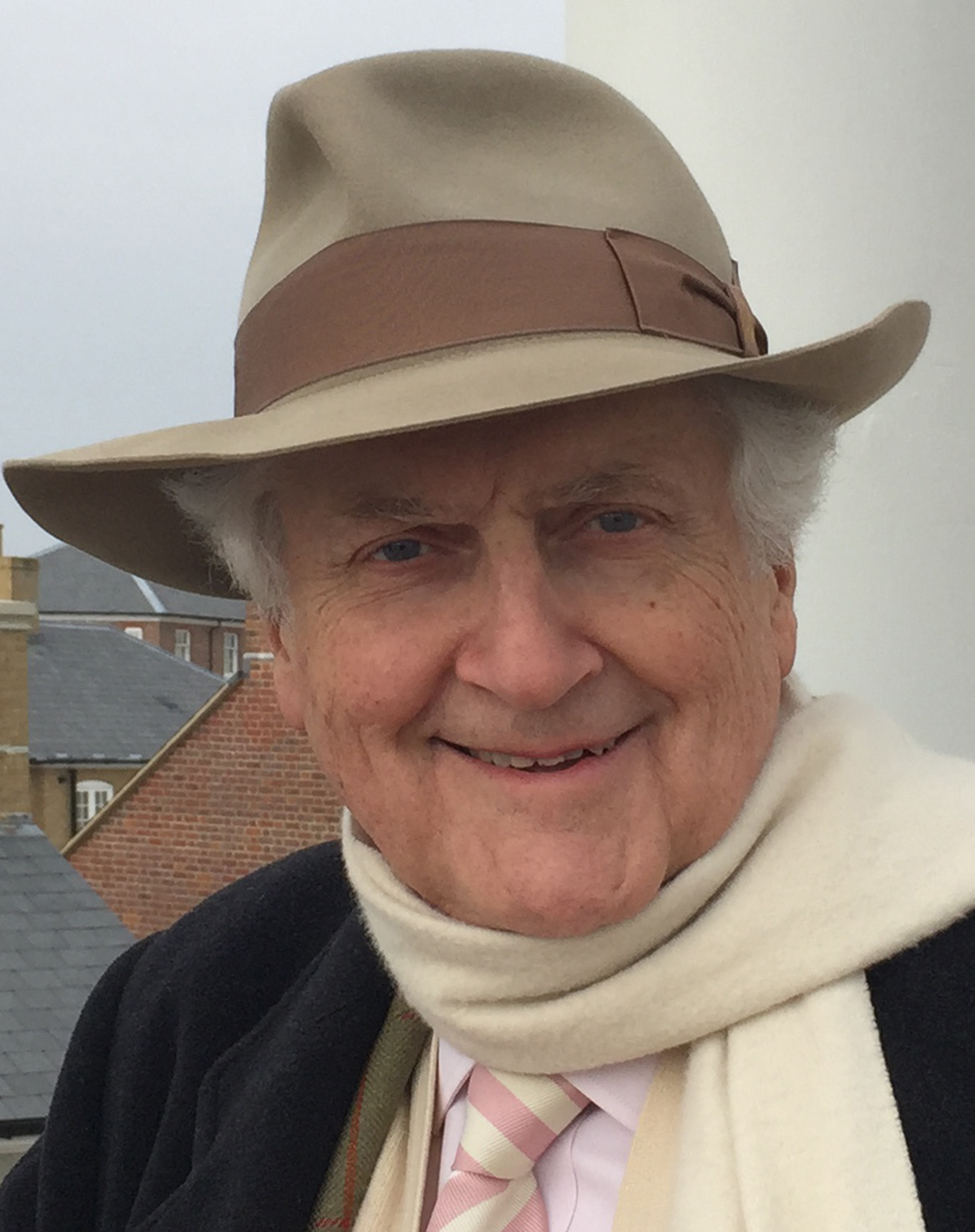
- Krier in 2016
- Born: 7 April 1946; Luxembourg City, Luxembourg
- Died: 17 June 2025 (aged 79); Palma de Mallorca, Spain
- Occupation: Architect
- Awards: Driehaus Architecture Prize 2003; CNU Athena Medal 2006; Commander of the Royal Victorian Order

Léon Krier CVO (7 April 1946 – 17 June 2025) was a Luxembourgish architect, architectural theorist, and urban planner, a prominent critic of modernist architecture and advocate of New Classical architecture and New Urbanism. Krier combined an international architecture and planning practice with writing and teaching. He was well known for his master plan for Poundbury, in Dorset, England. He was the younger brother of architect Rob Krier.

== Background ==
Krier was born in Luxembourg City on 7 April 1946 to Emma Marguerite (née Lanser) and Jean Pierre Jacques Krier, a tailor who supplied most of the ecclesiastical robes to the country's bishops. The small city that he grew up in would inspire him later in his architectural career. He attended the Lycée Classique in the monastery of the Abbey of Echternach. He initially wanted to be a pianist, but studied architecture instead due to the influence of his older brother Robert.

Krier was appointed Honorary Commander of the Royal Victorian Order (CVO) in 2017. He died on 17 June 2025, at the age of 79.

== Career ==
On 27 October 2017, in the Main Square of Poundbury, Dorset, designed by Léon Krier, Prince Charles unveiled a statue in tribute to the late Queen Mother, the pedestal of which was designed also by Léon Krier.

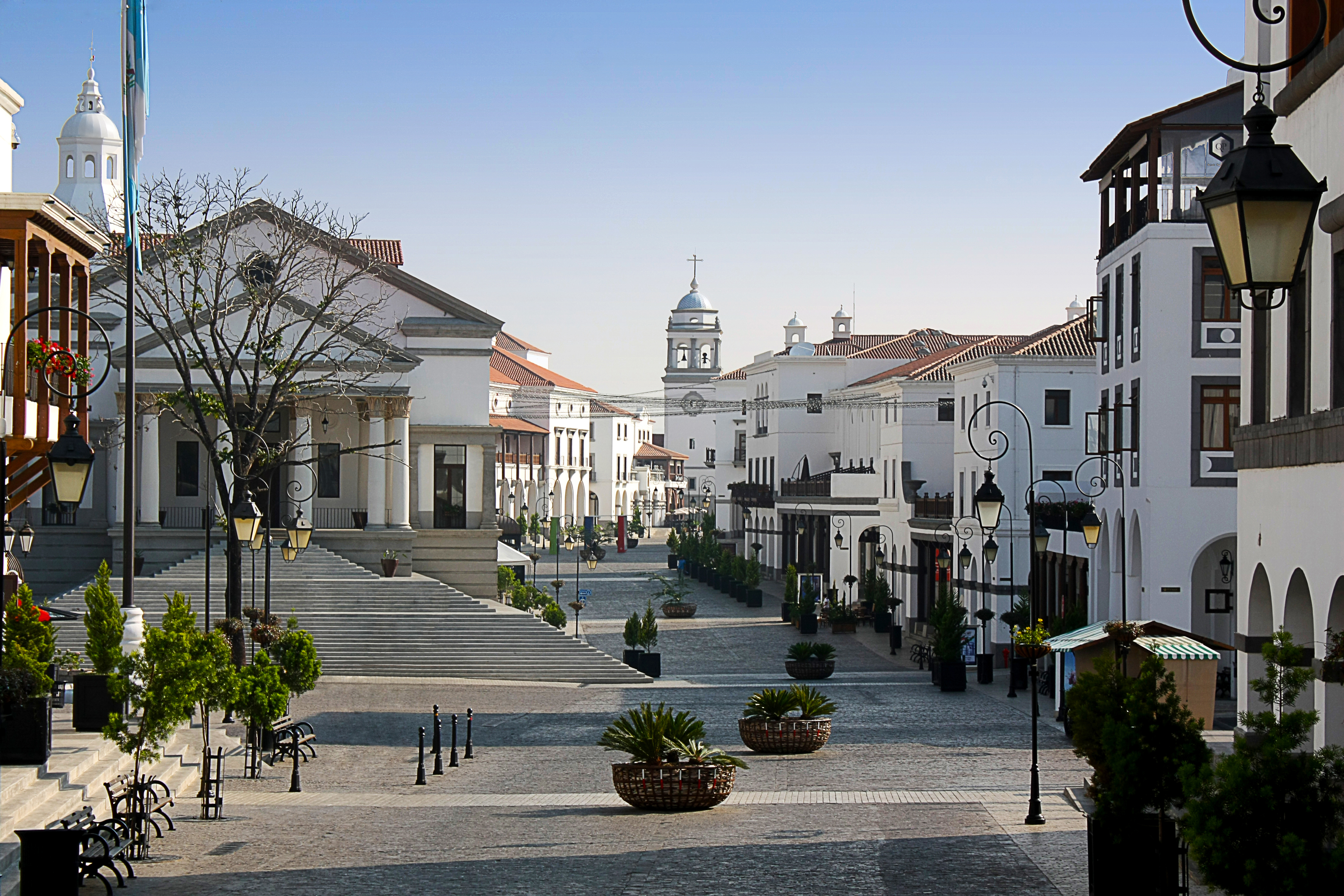
Ciudad Cayalá, Guatemala City, Guatemala

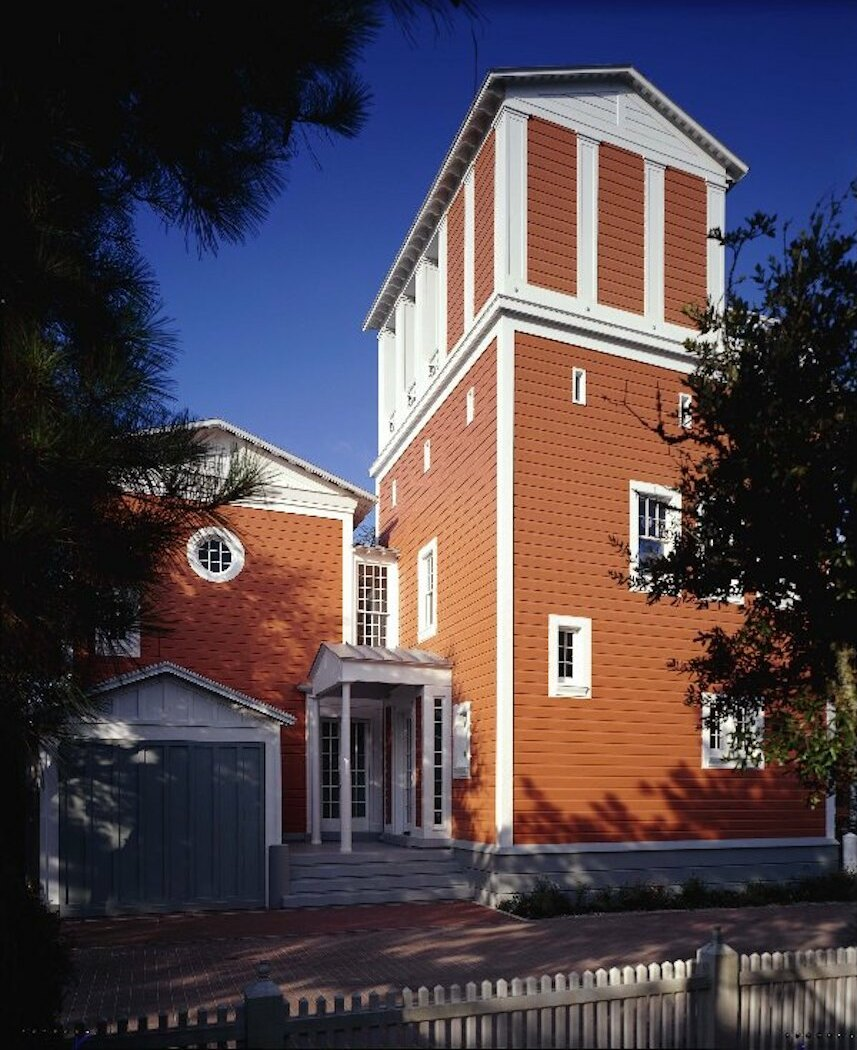
The Krier House, Seaside, Florida, designed late 1980s

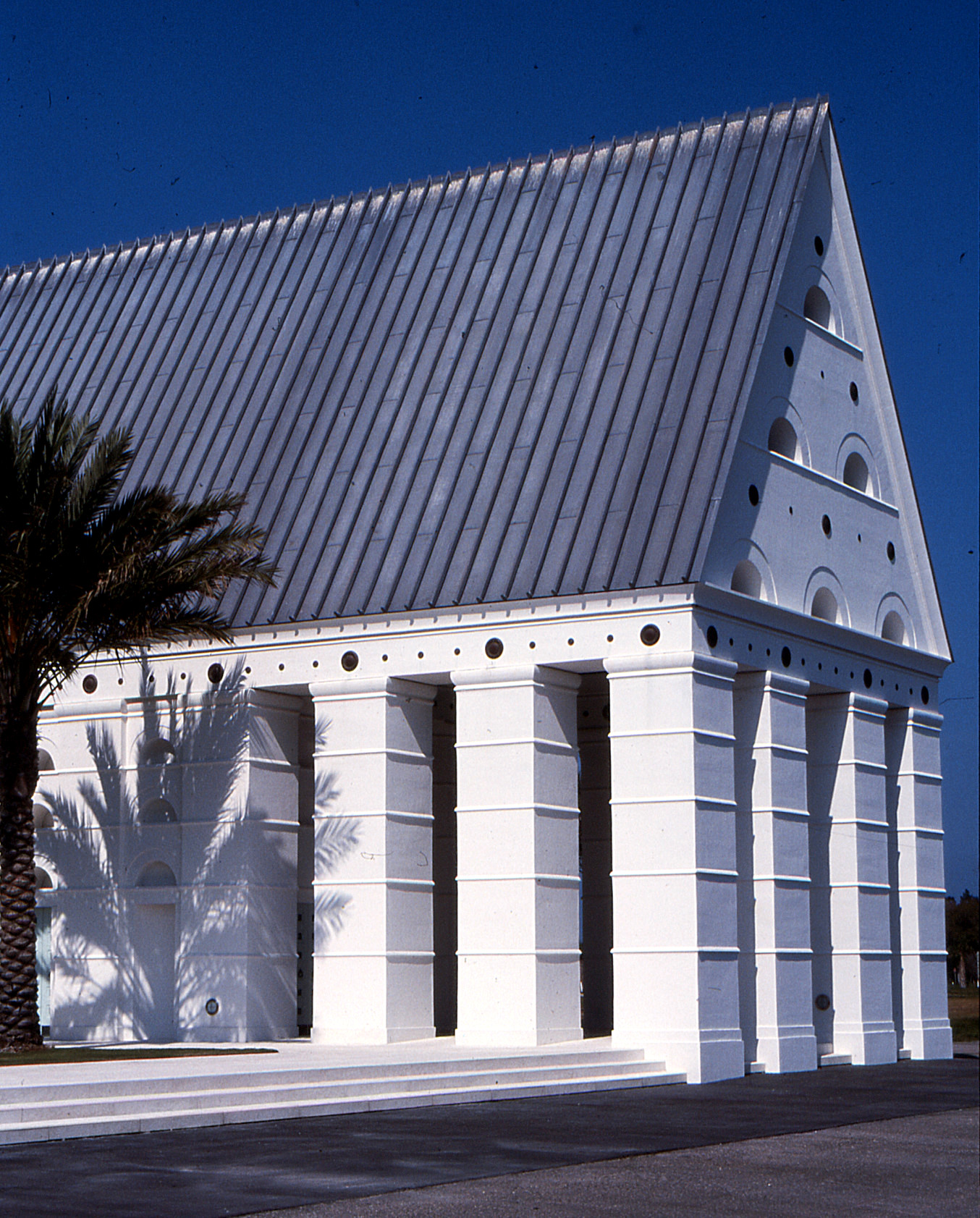
Village Hall, Windsor, Florida, 1997, by Léon Krier

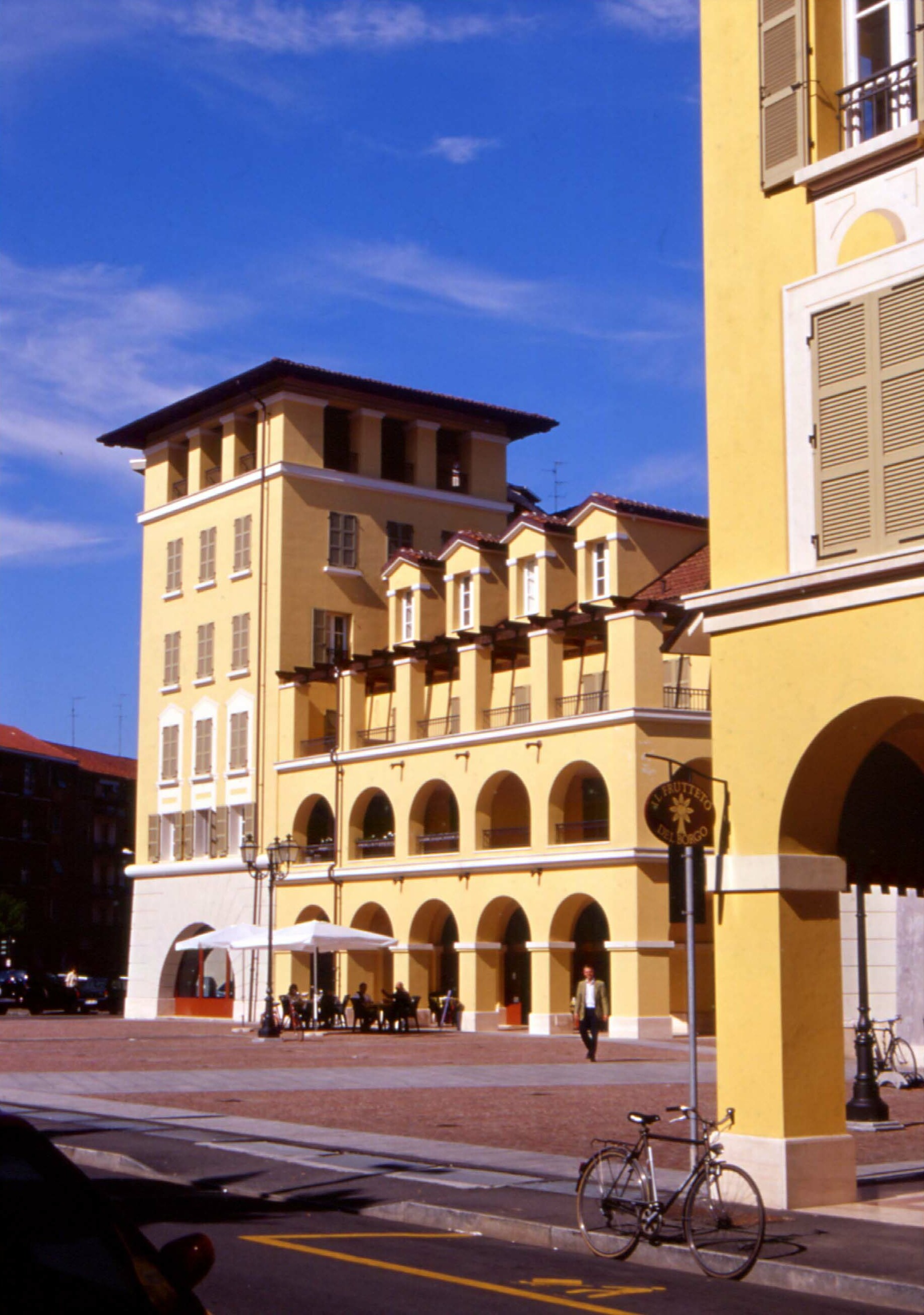
Città Nuova in Alessandria, Italy

Krier abandoned his architectural studies at the University of Stuttgart, Germany, in 1968, after only one year, to work in the office of architect James Stirling in London, UK. After four years working for Stirling, interrupted by a two-year association with Josef Paul Kleihues in Berlin, Krier spent 20 years in England practising and teaching at the Architectural Association and Royal College of Art. In this period, Krier's statement: "I am an architect, because I don't build", became a famous expression of his uncompromising anti-modernist attitude. From the late 1970s on, he was one of the most influential modern traditional architects and planners. He was one of the first and most prominent critics of architectural modernism, mainly of its functional zoning and the ensuing suburbanism, campaigning for the renaissance of the traditional grown city model and its growth based on the polycentric city model.

His ideas had a great influence on the New Urbanism movement, both in the US and Europe. The most complete compilation of his theoretical and polemical writings is published in his book The Architecture of Community (2009).

He is best known for his masterplan for, and ongoing oversight of, the development of Poundbury, an urban extension to Dorchester, UK for the Duchy of Cornwall and Charles III; and for his masterplan for Paseo Cayalá, an extension of four new urban quarters for Guatemala City. From 1976 to 2016, Krier was a visiting professor at the Universities of Princeton, Yale, Virginia, Cornell and Notre Dame. From 1987 to 1990, Krier was the first director of the SOMAI, the Skidmore, Owings & Merrill Architectural Institute, in Chicago. From 1990 on, Krier was an industrial designer for Valli e Valli – Assa Abloy and Giorgetti, an Italian furniture company. In 2003, Krier became the inaugural Driehaus Architecture Prize laureate.

Krier acted as architectural consultant on his urban planning projects but only designed buildings of his choice. Amongst his best known realisations are the temporary façade in The Presence of the Past exhibition at the 1980 Venice Biennale; the Krier house in the resort village of Seaside, Florida, USA (where he also advised on the masterplan); the Archaeological Museum of São Miguel de Odrinhas, Portugal; the Windsor Village Hall in Florida; the Jorge M. Perez Architecture Center, the University of Miami School of Architecture in Miami, Florida; the new Neighbourhood Center Città Nuova in Alessandria, Italy. and the urban complex Il Piombetto in Valenza.

Though Krier is well known for his defence of classical architecture and the reconstruction of traditional "European city" models, close scrutiny of his work in fact shows a shift from an early Modernist rationalist approach (project for University of Bielefeld, 1968) towards a vernacular and classical approach both formally and technologically. The project that marked a major turning point in his campaigning attitude towards the reconstruction of the traditional European city was his scheme (unrealised) for the 'reconstruction' of his home city of Luxembourg (1978), in response to the modernist redevelopment of the city. He later master planned Luxembourg's new Cité Judiciaire that was to be architecturally designed by his brother (1990–2008).

In 1990, of the nine experts invited, he was the only one to support the Dresden citizens' initiative to reconstruct the historic Dresden Frauenkirche and the Historische Neumarkt area. In 2007 he also stood alone when he supported the Frankfurt Altstadt Forum, that had been established in 2004 to lead the debate on reconstructing the historic city (Altstadt). Krier was a popular voice against architectural modernism. He framed the debate on classical architecture and argued that planners as well as investors should return to traditional concepts of community building. Central to his approach were civic spaces. He also maintained that a city should be built so that no elevators or automobiles need to necessarily be used. But underwhelming to his supporters, the majority of his plans were never built.

Krier applied his theories in large and detailed plans for numerous cities in the Western world. These include the unrealised schemes for Kingston upon Hull (1977), Rome (1977), Luxembourg (1978) (which was his most comprehensive master plan focusing on sprawl mitigation and town center repair), West Berlin (1977–83), Bremen (1978–1980), Stockholm (1981), Poing Nord, Munich (1983), a master plan to be completed in the year 2000 for Washington D.C. (1984) commissioned by the Museum of Modern Art of New York; Atlantis, a neoclassical district for intellectuals and artists on Tenerife (1987); Area Fiat, Novoli (Florence), Italy (1993), Corbeanca, Romania (2007), and the High Malton Masterplan for the Fitzwilliam Estate, Yorkshire, England (2014).

In 2009, MIT Press published the book Drawing for Architecture. It consists of a selection of Krier's often polemical drawings on the theme of architecture and urban planning, made during a period of 35 years. Krier designed plans commissioned by public administrations, including the redevelopment of Tor Bella Monaca, a degraded suburb of Rome (2010), and a long-term redevelopment policy plan for the municipal area of Cattolica, Rimini, Italy (2017). He applied similar principles to build developments such as Knokke, Heulebrug, Belgium (1998), completed without his direction. His master plan for the Newquay growth area (2002–2006) in Cornwall continued after his resignation from Adam Associates.

Krier died on 17 June 2025 in Palma de Mallorca, Spain, aged 79; he had recently been diagnosed with inoperable colorectal cancer.

== The size of the city ==
Krier agreed with the viewpoint of the late Heinrich Tessenow that there is a strict relationship between the economic and cultural wealth of a city, on the one hand, and the limitation of its population on the other. But this is not a matter of mere hypothesis, he argued, but historical fact. The measurements and geometric organisation of a city and of its quarters are not the result of mere chance or accident or simply of economic necessity, but rather represents a civilising order which is not only aesthetic and technical but also legislative and ethical.

Krier claimed, that "the whole of Paris is a pre-industrial city which still works, because it is so adaptable, something the creations of the 20th century will never be. A city like Milton Keynes cannot survive an economic crisis, or any other kind of crisis, because it is planned as a mathematically determined social and economic project. If that model collapses, the city will collapse with it." Thus Krier argued not merely against the contemporary modernist city (he in fact argued that places like Los Angeles, US, are not cities), but against a gigantism tendency in urban growth, evident in the exploding scale of urban networks and buildings in European cities throughout the 19th century which was a result of the concentration of economic, political and cultural power. In response to this, Krier proposed the reconstruction of the European city, based on polycentric settlement models which are dictated not by machine scale but by human scale both horizontally and vertically, of self-sufficient mixed use quarters not exceeding 33 hectares (82 acres) (able to be crossed in 10 minutes walk) of building heights of 3 to 5 floors or 100 steps (able to be walked up comfortably) and which are limited not by mere administrative borders but by walkable, rideable, driveable boulevards, tracks, park ways. Cities then grow by the multiplication of independent urban quarters, not by horizontal or vertical over-extensions of established urban cores.

== On the development of the city ==
Krier wrote a number of essays − many first published in the journal Architectural Design, against modernist town planning and its principle of dividing up the city into a system of single use zones (housing, shopping, industry, leisure, etc.), as well as the resultant suburbia, commuting, etc. Indeed, Krier saw the modernist planner as a tyrannical figure who imposes detrimental megastructural scale more dictated by ideology than necessity.

== On architecture and the city ==
The principle behind Krier's writings is to explain the rational foundations of architecture and the city, stating that "In the language of symbols, there can exist no misunderstanding". That is to say, for Krier, buildings have a rational order and type: a house, a palace, a temple, a campanile, a church; but also a roof, a column, a window, etc., what he terms "nameable objects". As projects get bigger, he goes on to argue, the buildings should not get bigger, but divide up; thus, for instance, in his unrealised scheme for a school in Saint-Quentin-en-Yvelines (1978), France, the school became a "city in miniature".

Krier proposed functional programs greatly varied within each block and plot. For him the building's design should always be typologically or tectonically justified and the variety of building types and volumes should reflect this functional variety in an evident and natural way; in short all gratuitous uniformity or gratuitous variety should be avoided designing neighbouring building lots of dimensional, functional and thus formal variety and in such a way as to generate networks of public spaces consisting of public streets, squares, avenues, boulevards, and parks. For Krier it was essential to compose at once the harmony of the urban blocks and of the inseparable public spaces generated between them.

In searching for such a typological architecture, Krier's work has been termed "an architecture without a style". He has also been praised for leaving "a transformed intellectual terrain where traffic modernism has been discredited." However, it has also been pointed out that "the appearance of his architecture is very much like Roman architecture, which he then places in all his projects, be it central London, Stockholm, Tenerife or Florida." Leon Krier defended the architecture of Hitler cabinet minister Albert Speer, distinguishing his work from the regime he served.

=== A selection of manifesto texts by Krier ===
- The idea of reconstruction
- Critique of zoning
- Town and country
- Critique of the megastructural city
- Critique of industrialisation
- Urban components
- The city within the city – Les Quartiers
- The size of a city
- Critique of Modernisms
- Organic versus mechanical composition
- Names and nicknames
- Building and architecture
- The reconstruction of the European city
- What is an urban quartier? Form and legislation

== Selected publications ==
Sources: Léon Krier: selected publications available online Leon Krier – Selected Publications.

- James Stirling: buildings & projects 1950–1974, Stuttgart, Gerd Hatje, 1975
- Rational Architecture Rationelle, Bruxelles, AAM Editions, 1978.
- Léon Krier. Houses, Palaces, Cities. Edited by Demetri Porphyrios, Architectural Design, 54 7/8, 1984.
- Léon Krier Drawings 1967–1980, Bruxelles, AAM Editions, 1981.
- Albert Speer, Architecture 1932–1942, Bruxelles, AAM Editions, 1985. New York, Monacelli Press, 2013.
- Léon Krier: Architecture & Urban Design 1967–1992, London, Academy Editions, 1992.
- Architecture: Choice or Fate, London, Andreas Papadakis Publishers, 1998.
- Get Your House Right, Architectural Elements to Use & Avoid, New York, Sterling Publishing, 2007
- The Architectural Tuning of Settlements, London, The Prince's Foundation, 2008
- Drawing for Architecture, Cambridge (Massachusetts), MIT Press, 2009.
- The Architecture of Community, Washington DC, Island Press, 2009.
