= SouthWood, Tallahassee, Florida =

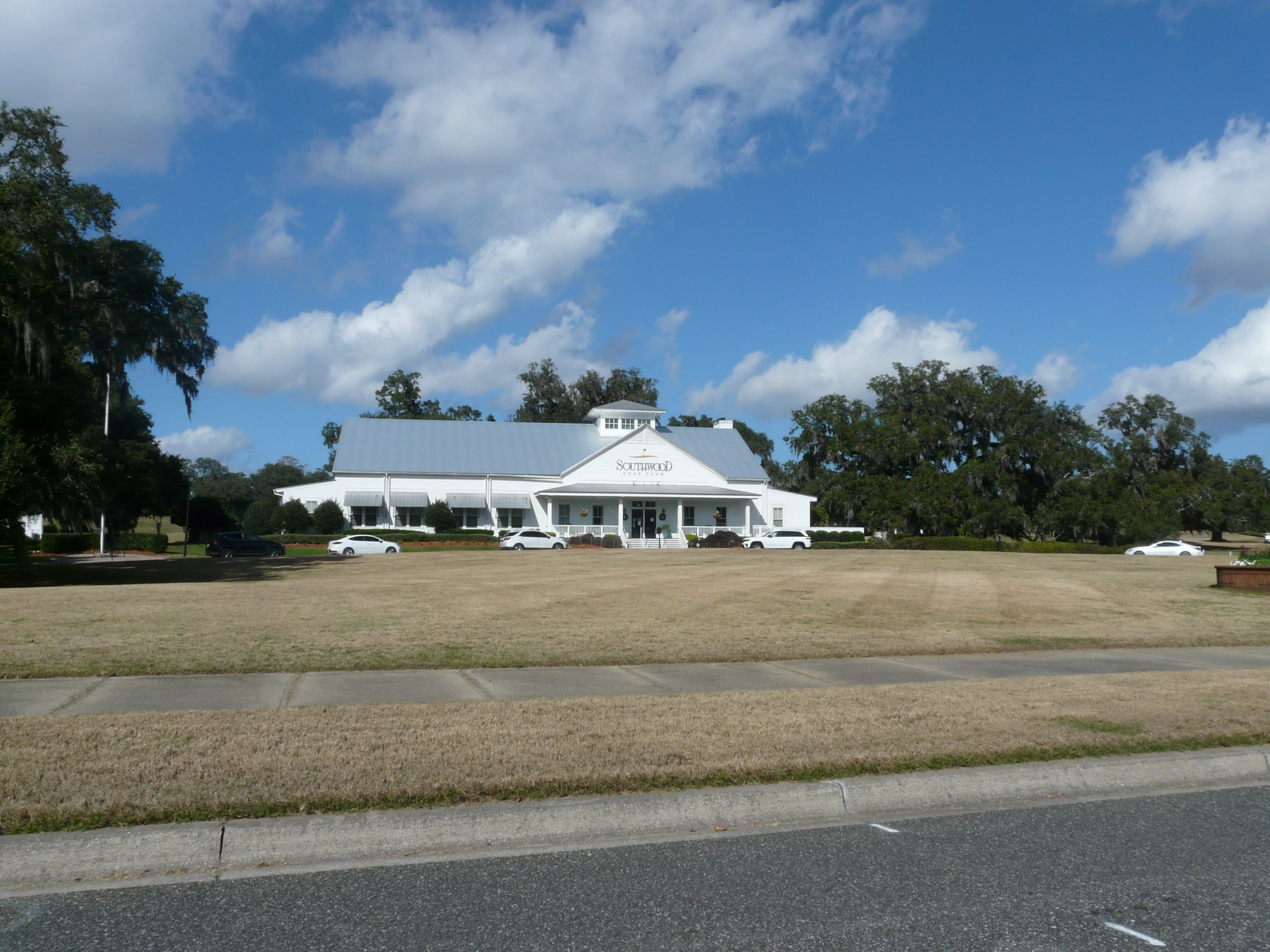
Southwood Golf Club clubhouse

SouthWood is a planned community in Tallahassee, Florida. The community is sited on the southeast side. the community is located in the State of Florida Capital Circle Office Complex, Florida State University School, and John Paul II Catholic High School.

The 8,700 acres (3,500 ha) development was controversial. It was planned by Southwood Properties, the development subsidiary of the St. Joe Paper Company. It was canceled in 1989 after the Florida Department of Community Affairs (DCA) required 40% affordable housing. A new plan for the project, developed by St. Joe/Arvida, was approved by the city in 1999.

SouthWood is part of the Capital Region Community Development District, a local, special purpose government entity authorized by Chapter 190 of the Florida Statutes, and created by the Florida Land and Water Adjudicatory Commission as an alternative method of planning, acquiring, operating and maintaining community-wide improvements in planned communities. A CDD provides the "solution" to Florida’s need to provide valuable community infrastructure generated by growth, ultimately without overburdening other governments and their taxpaying residents. Community Development Districts represent a major advancement in Florida’s effort to manage its growth. This allows a developer to establish higher construction standards, meanwhile providing a long-term solution to the operation and maintenance of community facilities.

The Capital Region Community Development District is organized like other local governments in Florida, in that the legislative body is composed of a five-member board known as the Board of Supervisors. The Board establishes District policy. The Board, by law, must hire a District Administrator and District Counsel. Staff members use the same formalities as a County Administrator and County Attorney. The Board, through review of advertised Requests for Qualifications, ranks and selects a District Engineer to address the District's engineering needs. District Administration staff and the District Attorney administer the operations of the District and implement the Board’s policies and contracts.

== See also ==
- Florida State University School
