= Park DuValle, Louisville =

- Neighbourhood
- Location within Kentucky Location within the United States
- Coordinates: 38°13′42″N 85°48′40″W
- Country: United States
- State: Kentucky
- County: Jefferson County

Park DuValle is a neighborhood southwest of downtown Louisville, Kentucky. It was developed starting in the late-19th century and historically been a predominantly African-American community. Its boundaries are I-264 (the Shawnee Expressway) to the west, the Norfolk Southern Railway tracks to the north, Cypress Street to the east, and Bells Lane and Algonquin Parkway to the south. The neighborhood reflects the presence of several nearby parks, and DuValle Junior High School; all named after Lucie DuValle, the first female principal of a high school in Louisville.

== History ==
The area began residential development in the late 19th century but most subdivisions were built after the 1940s. It was originally a part of Parkland's "Little Africa" community, where thousands of blacks had moved following the Civil War. The shanty homes of Little Africa were replaced with Cotter and Lang housing projects by Urban renewal efforts.

Those now-dilapidated projects are being rebuilt with a HOPE VI revitalization effort, and applying principles of New Urbanism into its design. The new Park DuValle neighborhood, a $200 million investment of public and private funds covering 125 acres (0.51 km^{2}), once dominated by 1100 public housing units, is being transformed into a mixed-income neighborhood in Louisville's west end. The goal of the HOPE VI plan is to build a series of traditional neighborhoods with rental and home ownership opportunities for a wide range of income groups. The greatest challenge has been to successfully provide public housing for those in need while simultaneously attracting middle-income home buyers to the neighborhood. UDA prepared an area-wide Master Plan for the effort that ties in adjacent communities and creates a new commercial center with shops and services for the residential neighborhoods. In addition to the Master Plan, Urban Design Associates created a UDA Pattern Book to guide the design of the housing and to establish the character of each neighborhood. By using the images and forms identified with successful, traditional Louisville neighborhoods, it is hoped that Park DuValle will become attractive to a broad cross section of residents.
