= Borgo Città Nuova =

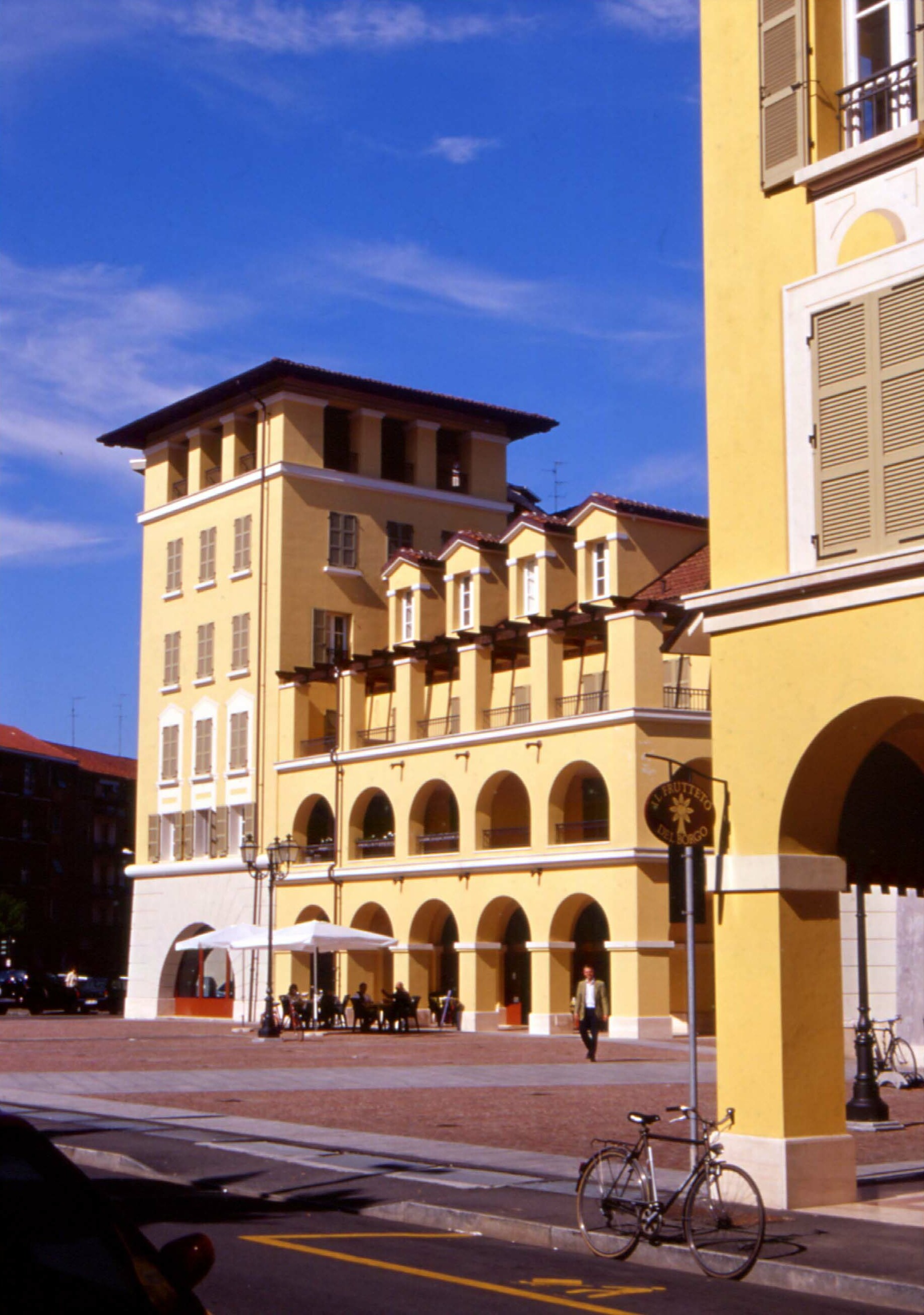

General information
- Architectural style: New Classical architecture New Urbanism
- Location: Alessandria, Italy
- Coordinates: 44.903873117791235°N 8.619088848671401°E
- Year built: 1995 - 2002

Design and construction
- Architect: Léon Krier
- Engineer: Gabriele Tagliaventi

Borgo Città Nuova is an urban complex situated in the Pista district of Alessandria, Italy. The comples was designed by Léon Krier and Gabriele Tagliaventi in New Classical style. Built during the same period of Poundbury, Dorset, England was intended as a manifesto for the New Urbanism movement. In Italian Borgo Città Nuova means New Town Hamlet.

== History and description ==
The complex, commissioned by a private company, was built between 1995 and 2002 to redevelop the area previously occupied by the OLVA company’s warehouses in Alessandria, and was promoted in 1998 as the first major urban regeneration project with an international conference and the opening of an exhibition, as the designers intended it to be a manifesto project for the New Urbanism movement.

In keeping with the tradition of New Urbanism, the aim of the project was to contrast vernacular architectural tradition with the models of urban development from the second half of the 20th century; the new neighbourhood was conceived as an artificially stratified village that sought to syncretise the architectural language of urban development from the second half of the 20th century with the existing urban fabric.

The project covered a site of approximately one hectare and was centred on the creation of a central square in the Pista neighbourhood. The original plan was to incorporate the block containing the Church of the Madonna del Suffragio, a Neo-Gothic building completed in 1927 and separated from the Borgo Città Nuova site by Via Antonio Pacinotti. This integration would have been achieved through the construction of a bell tower, which the church currently lacks. Furthermore, the project comprised 2,500 m² of paved public spaces, 6,000 m² of residential units, 2,000 m² of office space, 1,000 m² of retail space, 500 m² designated for banking facilities and 300 underground parking spaces. The bell tower and the fountain planned for the church area were not included in the final design, and the parish remained isolated from the Borgo Città Nuova complex.

Once completed, the complex consists of seven separate buildings, the tallest of which is seven storeys high, arranged across four blocks, with new streets, flanked by arcades and retail spaces of varying sizes, cutting diagonally across the blocks. Characteristic features of the neighbourhood include the use, in its open spaces, of architectural elements from the Alexandrian architectural tradition and its mixed-use nature, with residential functions complemented by commercial and banking activities, with the aim of ensuring the area’s vitality. The façades are enhanced by the use of rustication, a design feature adopted to ensure continuity along the urban frontage in relation to the adjacent buildings.

The various building elements, which vary in size and shape, are interspersed with walled courtyards and gardens; the flats are oriented in multiple directions to maximise natural light and ventilation, whilst the upper floors are crowned by open loggias, pergolas, terraces and belvedere. The main access to the Borgo Città Nuova is a marked by the facade of the bank, with its peculiare exedra with a Doric column, conceived as a ‘monument’ to the historical and architectural intervention.

The new urban sector has been interpreted as out of keeping with the context of the Pista neighbourhood, traditionally characterised by the architectural style of the early decades of the 20th century, with Borgo Città Nuova creating the effect of an urban stage set, featuring converging axes, small squares, low loggia-lined buildings and internal courtyards with an illusionistic and alienating effect.

Krier and Tagliaventi designed a similar urban complex in Valenza, a town 7 miles north of Alessandria. The Valenza urban development, called Il Piombetto was designed and built between 1997 and 2002.

== Bibliography ==
- Giusti, Maria Adriana Rosa; Tamborrino, Rosa (2008). Guida all'architettura del Novecento in Piemonte (1902-2006). Turin: Allemandi & C. ISBN 9788842216384.
- Krier, Léon (2009). The Architecture of Community. Island Press. ISBN 978-1-59726-578-2.

== Related articles ==
- New Urbanism
- New Classical Architecture
