= Tschumi =

Tschumi is a surname. Notable people with the surname include:

- Bernard Tschumi (born 1944), Swiss architect, writer, and educator
- Gabriel Tschumi (1883–1957), Swiss Master Chef to three British monarchs
- Jean Tschumi (1904–1962), Swiss architect and professor
- Otto Tschumi (1904–1985), Swiss painter
- Regula Tschumi, Swiss social anthropologist and art historian
