= Crawford Square =

Coordinates: 40.4427°N 79.9854°W

Crawford Square is a New Urbanist apartment and townhome community located in Pittsburgh, Pennsylvania.

== Location ==
The development is part of the larger Hill District neighborhood of Pittsburgh and is directly adjacent to Downtown Pittsburgh. Its boundaries are generally Crawford Street to the west, Centre Avenue to the south, Roberts Street to the east, and Webster Avenue to the north. The Hill District's famed Wylie Avenue runs through the development.

== Brief history ==
The location which is now "Crawford Square" was an elevated slope about one mile (1.6 km) east of the original city of Pittsburgh. In 1800, only 1565 people lived in Pittsburgh. Separate annexations occurred in 1837, 1847, 1868, 1874, and 1906. In 1900, 321,616 residents were counted, including a group of Jews who had constructed the first synagogue (now demolished and replaced) near Elm Street. At that time, a local term for the large general area was "Jews Hill." Despite that name, other sorts of people lived there, including Italians, African Americans, Russians, and more.

The number of Jews who had established businesses within the large general area that was at one time called "Jews Hill" by other residents of the city of Pittsburgh has declined by at least 90 percent, but a paltry number of Jews still exists there. The place that is now called "Crawford Square" is centrally located within the large general area formerly called "Jews Hill" by earlier residents of the city of Pittsburgh. Today there is very little physical evidence of the former Jewish presence in the neighborhood as Jewish businesses and synagogues have been replaced over time.

By the early 20th century the Hill District's Jewish presence became less prominent as the neighborhood became a hub for African-American culture. More than 24,000 "negro" immigrants arrived from 1850 to 1900 and concentrated in the Hill District. By the 1920s and 30s it was known for its eclectic jazz clubs and speakeasies, often covered in the pages of the Pittsburgh Courier by writers like Frank E. Bolden.

Although the Hill District was known for its rich culture and diversity of residents (Jews and other ethnic groups remained a fixture of the neighborhood), Pittsburgh authorities began to see its density, proximity to downtown, and high proportion of African Americans as reason to target the district for "slum clearance." As early as 1914, the Hill District's African –American and immigrant groups were being condemned for their "moral vice." The verbal and written condemnation of such African-American-dominated neighborhoods was a common occurrence as a post-industrial response to changing demographics and deteriorating urban environments in North American cities. This type of rhetoric was used to strategically discriminate against neighborhoods like the Hill District. According to reports on the Hill District, African-American girls and women from the South populated the worst of the Pittsburgh brothels—the "alley houses of the Hill District.". Later, increasing attention was given to housing conditions in the area. In 1946, the fledgling Pittsburgh Housing Authority published a report on "Negro housing needs," condemning the propensity of African American communities for overcrowding and calling for further assistance to this underserved population. Although the report claims "Large scale demolition […] was largely finished in Pittsburgh by 1940,"the Hill District was to see an ambitious clearance project that would displace 8000 Hill District residents between 1956 and 1960.

100 acres, 1300 buildings, and 413 businesses were wiped away by demolition in the "revitalization" project for the Hill. Rather than bringing housing projects to the area to replace those that were demolished, the clearings made way for commercial and cultural projects. The first and only of these was the city's Civic Arena, which opened in 1961 to house the Civic Light Opera. Community opposition, financial constraints, and local leaders’ decisions led to a halt in development of the cleared land. In 1968, race riots following the assassination of Martin Luther King Jr. caused further disinvestment in the Hill District. The cleared land languished for decades and became what could be described as an urban wasteland— the vacant lots became overgrown with only a few scattered structures remaining. Meanwhile, the Hill District steadily deteriorated and lost population. In the late 1980s progress in reconstructing the area was finally made. Pittsburgh's Urban Redevelopment Authority (URA) acquired the derelict land and, with the participation of the Hill Community Development Corporation—the Hill District's newly formed community group—succeeded in initiating the development process for the area.

The new project, "Crawford Square," was constructed in three phases: Phase I in 1993, Phase II in 1995, and Phase III in 2000. It received funding from federal, state and local sources including the U.S. Department of Housing and Urban Development (HUD), the Pennsylvania Housing Finance Agency (PHCA), local banks and foundations, and the URA itself. The URA first called upon the mixed income real-estate developer McCormack Baron Salazar to lead development. McCormack Baron then contracted Urban Design Associates—an urban design/architectural firm based in Pittsburgh—who provided the project's architectural vision and master plan. The Urban Design Associates utilized many public focus group meetings with residents, community leaders, and stake holders to help formulate the Crawford Square design. Finally, the URA also enlisted other architectural firms who designed additional buildings for the final phases of the project.

== New Urbanist Design ==
Although Crawford Square was explicitly planned as a New Urbanist community, several key aspects of its design seem to contradict the goals of New Urbanism. The principles of New Urbanism call for higher densities, mixed uses, pedestrian accessibility, public transit, and the protection of natural environments—all in contrast to the sprawling suburbs of the American landscape. Crawford Square's deliberate accommodation of the automobile, lack of public transit, and non-integrated land use (all residential) are the most outstanding failures of Crawford Square to uphold New Urbanism; however, other features are more consistent with New Urbanism. The development's housing architecture and design were based on the local history and the topography of area (modifications were made to the structures based on the steep grade). The housing was designed after the traditional housing of the same area, but the Crawford Square landscape is quite visually distinct from the adjacent older streetscapes of the Hill District.

Crawford Square achieves mixed-use of land by incorporating public parks and community spaces, but it contains no commercial activity at all. There are no stores or commercial properties found in the Crawford Square project. On the other hand, it respects the desire for public space and encourages pedestrianism by offering wide sidewalks, off-street parking, and parks within walking distance. Next, the design of Crawford Square reinforces safety and security by including a lighting system. It also was specifically design to exclude any semi-private or "no-man's-land" spaces that were characteristic of mid-century housing projects and criticized strongly by notable authors such as Jane Jacobs. Perhaps because of the inclusion of safety features crime statistics from 2003, three years after the project was completed, show an encouraging trend. In a composite of violent crimes, Crawford Square falls just below the Pittsburgh average (Pittsburgh: 5.85 crimes /100 persons, Crawford-Roberts: 5.73/100) and significantly below the adjacent Middle Hill (at 8.07/100).

== Housing Types ==
Crawford Square is a mix of rental and for-sale apartments, townhomes and single-family homes. The development occupies 18 acres (73,000 m^{2}) that contain 350 rental units, 71 for-sale units, three public parks, a community pool, and a community center. The housing types are mixed consisting of townhouses and low-rise apartment buildings for single- to multi-family use. Parking is included for every unit, located behind the buildings in gated, enclosed lots. Green space and sidewalks are ample. Other features are that one-half all rental units are subsidized (and indistinct from non-subsidized units) and that all rental units and community spaces are maintained by the company McCormack Baron.

== Racially diverse residents ==
There are about 375 units of housing in Crawford Square, inhabited by people of various ethnic mixes. It is perhaps the most ethnically and socially diverse new housing development in the city of Pittsburgh. The 2000 U.S. census reveals that while the adjacent section of the Hill District, Middle Hill, is at 97% African American, Crawford-Roberts is slightly more integrated, at 87% African American. While it may be suggested that this is an indication of gentrification, household income figures show that Crawford Roberts actually has a higher proportion of residents at the lowest income bracket than Middle Hill.

== Buildings demolished prior to construction ==
Crawford Square replaced some noteworthy local establishments which had at one time fulfilled the needs or desires of people who lived in the city. Visitors to the city also patronized some of the establishments. All of the buildings have been obliterated and turned into dust.

- St. Joseph's House of Hospitality, founded by the Catholic Radical Alliance, provided a home for men who were in need. The organization has been relocated to 1635 Bedford Avenue, nearby.
- The Hurricane was a popular venue located on Centre Avenue. Music lovers gathered at the Hurricane which was owned by a woman named "Birdie." About ten city blocks further to the east stood the Crawford Grill, a more well-known establishment.
- Lou's Ringside Bar on Centre Avenue was a tavern that was well furnished and well attended by its patrons. It was an early establishment which could have been described as being a sports bar.

Other establishments such as small stores and taverns with apartments above them existed on Centre Avenue and on nearby streets. Residential homes were located on some of the streets, but only a handful of them still exist next to the new homes on Roberts Street.
