= Drawing for Architecture =

2009 book by Léon Krier

- Illustrator: Léon Krier
- Language: English
- Series: Writing Architecture
- Subject: urban planning
- Genre: polemical drawing
- Publisher: MIT Press
- Publication date: 10 July 2009
- Publication place: United States
- Pages: 248
- ISBN: 9780262512930
- OCLC: 253635261

Drawing for Architecture is a collection of drawings by the Luxembourgish architectural theorist Léon Krier. MIT Press published it in 2009 as part of its Writing Architecture series.

== Summary ==
The book consists of both previously published and new drawings, made during a period of 35 years. Krier's images are often polemical and present his thoughts and visions regarding urban planning, which are associated with New Urbanism. According to Krier's author's note, he made his drawings in "angry bursts" and the purpose was "not to console or please but to reveal scandalous elements of architectural practices and ideology".

== Reception ==
Susan Salter Reynolds of the Los Angeles Times wrote that the playful and witty impression the drawings give at a first glance soon is diminished by a sense of anger and disaster, as they portray deformed bodies, stupidity and shapelessness. She wrote that the pictures "speak (I should say shout) volumes about hubris", although "some are pure fun".

David van der Leer of Bomb also wrote that a first impression quickly changes, writing that the book recalls the drawings of Camillo Sitte from the late 19th century. He wrote that Drawing for Architecture presents a programme for spatial experiences that affirm the human body and thereby nature, and that when Krier is not merely promoting traditional architectural styles, he is a "smart cultural observer" who may inspire younger designers to develop approaches that are neither traditionalist nor modernist.

Ned Cramer of Architect Magazine wrote that new drawings on environmental themes and a foreword by the "peak oil agitator" James Howard Kunstler make the book more than "a mere greatest-hits collection". Cramer described the content as "scathingly funny swipes at the architectural avant-garde, passion pleas for human-scale urbanism, and alarming attempts to restore the reputation of Nazi classicist Albert Speer".

== See also ==
- Architecture's Desire
