= DOD =

DOD, Dod and DoD may refer to:

== People ==
- Dod (surname)
- Dod (nickname)

== Location ==
- Dod, Faridkot, a village in Punjab, India

== Government ==
- United States Department of Defense

== Science and technology ==
- Depth of discharge, a measure of how much energy has drained from a battery
- Direct Outward Dialing, in telephony
- DOD Electronics, an electronics company that makes effects pedals for musicians
- DrinkOrDie, a software-cracking and warez-trading network
- Drop-on-demand, a printing technology
- Displacement on demand, or Active Fuel Management, an automobile variable displacement technology
- Data-oriented design, an approach to optimizing programs

== Music and film ==
- D.O.D. (album), by the rap group Do or Die released in 2005
- D.O.D. (DJ) (Dan O'Donnell), a British DJ and record producer
- Do or Die (disambiguation) refers to many groups, songs, albums and films
- "D.O.D." (Drink Or Die), a song from the album Hide Your Face by Japanese musician Hide
- Indiana Jones and the Dial of Destiny, a 2023 American film starring Harrison Ford

== Games ==
- Day of Defeat, a first-person shooter multiplayer game developed by Valve
- Drakar och Demoner, the Swedish roleplaying game by Target Games
- Dawn of Discovery (disambiguation), American name of several video games
- Drag-On Dragoon, the Japanese name of the Drakengard series

== Other uses ==
- IATA airport code for Dodoma Airport
- Date of death
- Arabic letter Ḍād ض
- Definition of done, a term used in Agile project management

== See also ==
- Dodd (disambiguation)
- Dods (disambiguation)
- Dodds (disambiguation)
- Dodi (disambiguation)
