= Dodd (surname) =

The English surname Dodd is one of the first Anglo-Saxon names recorded. Depending on the region, the name has multiple origins. In the West of England, Dodd is understood to be of Ancient Welsh Celtic origin. It may also have Germanic origins if found in the East of England, stemming from a description of something "round or plump" as a surname based on nicknames. The surname Dodd may also be derived from the Old English word "dydrian", in East England which means deceiver or rascal, or from the word "dod", which means to make bare or to cut off. The application of the name Dodd is obvious in the former case, while the nickname would denote a bald person in the latter case. Through migration, the surname Dodd has become common throughout the British Isles and the broader English-speaking world.

Notable people with the surname include:

== Politics ==
- Charles J. Dodd (New York politician) (1873–1947), American lawyer, politician, and judge
- Christopher Dodd (born 1944), American politician and lobbyist
- Cyril Dodd (1844–1913), British politician
- Jabez Edward Dodd (1867–1928), Western Australian politician
- Thomas J. Dodd (1907–1971), American politician and prosecutor
- William Dodd (ambassador) (1869–1940), historian and diplomat

== Performing and modelling ==
- Cal Dodd (born 1956), voice actor
- Carl Nicholas Henty-Dodd (1935–2009), British TV and radio presenter better known as Simon Dee
- Claire Dodd (1908–1973), American actress
- Dick Dodd (1945–2013), American actor and musician
- Hannah Dodd (born 1995), English actress
- James William Dodd (1740–1796), English actor
- Jimmie Dodd (James Wesley Dodd, 1910–1964), American actor, singer and songwriter
- Ken Dodd (1927–2018), British comedian
- Marcie Dodd (born 1978), American stage actress and singer
- Mikyla Dodd (born 1978), British actress
- Molly Dodd (1921–1981), American actress
- Rory Dodd (born 1954), singer
- Steve Dodd (1928–2014), Australian actor
- Sue Anna Dodd (born 1996), Filipino actress better known as Sue Ramirez

== Sports figures ==
- Al Dodd (1945–1987), American football player
- Bobby Dodd (1908–1988), American college football coach
- Brad Dodd (born 1977), Australian Rules footballer
- Dylan Dodd (born 1998), American baseball player
- Hannah Dodd (Paralympian) (born 1992), Australian Grade IV equestrian and 1.0 point wheelchair basketball player
- Jason Dodd (born 1970), English footballer
- Jimmy Dodd (footballer) (1933–2017), English footballer
- Karl Dodd (born 1980), Australian soccer player
- Kevin Dodd (born 1992), American football player
- Marjorie Dodd (1894–1968), American tennis player and golfer
- Mark Dodd (born 1965), American soccer player
- Moya Dodd (born 1965), Australian soccer official, a lawyer and former national team player
- Robert Dodd (baseball) (born 1973), American baseball player
- Robert Dodd (footballer), English association footballer
- Sean Dodd (born 1984), British boxer
- Stephen Dodd (born 1966), Welsh golfer
- Steven Dodd (born 1983), Australian Rules footballer
- Travis Dodd (born 1980), Australian soccer player

== Creators of expressive works ==
- Anna Bowman Dodd (1858–1929), American author
- Bella Dodd (1904–1969), author
- Derrick Dodd, the pen-name of Frank Harrison Gassaway, American humorist and poet
- Ed Dodd (1902–1991), American cartoonist
- Eric Dodd, American record producer known as Eric Valentine
- Emma Dodd (born 1969), British children's author and illustrator
- Francis Dodd (1874–1949), artist
- James Dodd (born 1977), Australian artist better known as Dlux
- Jane Dodd (born 1962), New Zealand musician and jeweller
- Lamar Dodd (1909–1996), American painter
- Lois Dodd (born 1927), American painter
- Lucy Dodd (born 1981), American painter
- Lynley Dodd (born 1941), New Zealand children's writer
- Margaret Dodd (born 1941), Australian artist who works in ceramics and film/video
- Mary Ann H. Dodd (1813–1878), American poet
- Maurice Dodd (1922–2005), English cartoonist
- Phyllis Dodd (1899–1995), English portrait painter
- Robert Dodd (artist) (1748–1815), British marine painter
- Wayne Dodd (born 1930), American poet

== Academics and educators ==
- A. H. Dodd (1891–1975), Welsh historian
- C. H. Dodd (1884–1973), Welsh Bible scholar
- Clarence Orvil Dodd (1899–1955), American writer and church elder
- Charles Dodd (c. 1671–1743), pseudonym of British historian Hugh Tootell
- David Dodd (1895–1988), economist and educator
- Percy Dodd (1889–1931), Welsh classicist
- Stuart C. Dodd (1900–1975), sociologist
- Suzanne Dodd, NASA/JPL project manager
- Tim Dodd (born 1985), American science communicator

== Others ==
- Anne Dodd (c. 1685–1739), English news seller and pamphlet shop proprietor
- Clifford Dodd (1905–1971), Australian radio executive
- Coxsone Dodd (1932–2004), Jamaican record producer
- Dana Dodd (1985–2006), American murder victim, formerly known as "Lavender Doe"
- David Owen Dodd (1846–1864), hanged as a Confederate spy in the American Civil War
- Francis Dodd (general) (1899–1973), U.S. Army brigadier general
- R. Fielding Dodd (c. 1890–1958), Scottish architect
- James Dodd (disambiguation), several people, including
  - James Jonas Dodd (1863–1925), English political activist
  - James Munro Dodd (1915–1986), marine biologist
- Jennifer Susan Dodd Clarke, British philanthropist and business executive
- Josiah Eustace Dodd (1856–1952), South Australian pipe organ builder
- Martha Dodd (1908–1990), American spy
- Martin Dodd, Danish music executive
- Moses Woodruff Dodd (1813–1899), American publisher
- Phillip James Dodd (born 1971), English-American architect
- Ralph Dodd (1756–1822), English civil engineer and marine painter.
- Robert Dodd (disambiguation), several people, including
  - Robert F. Dodd (1844–1903), Canadian soldier who fought in the American Civil War
- Sonora Smart Dodd (1882–1978), American activist and founder of Father's Day
- Townsend F. Dodd (1886–1919), American aviator, first US pilot to receive the Distinguished Service Medal
- Westley Allan Dodd (1961–1993), American serial killer
- William Dodd (clergyman) (1729–1777), British religious leader, scholar and forger

== Fictional characters ==
- William Dodd, a villain in the Richard Sharpe book series and its TV adaptation

== See also ==
- Dodd (disambiguation)
- Dodds (surname)
