= Dod (surname) =

Dod is the surname of:

- Albert Baldwin Dod (1805–1845), American Presbyterian theologian and professor of mathematics
- Charles Dod Irish journalist and writer, known for his reference works, including Dod's Parliamentary Companion
- Daniel Dod (1788–1823), American mathematician and mechanical engineer who fabricated the engine for the first steamboat to cross the Atlantic Ocean
- Donald Dungan Dod (1912–2008), American missionary and orchidologist
- John Dod (c.1549–1645), non-conforming English clergyman
- Lottie Dod (1871–1960), English sportswoman, youngest winner of Wimbledon Ladies' Singles Championship
- Pierce Dod (1683–1754), British physician
- Thaddeus Dod (1740–1793), Presbyterian preacher and educator
- William Dod (1867–1954), British Olympic archer

== See also ==
- Dodd (surname)
- Dodds (surname)
- Dods (disambiguation), including people with the surname
