= Hilary Geary Ross =

American author and philanthropist

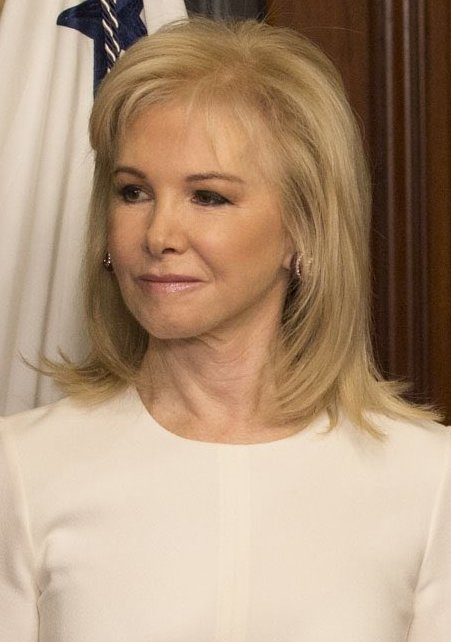
- Ross in 2017
- Born: July 4, 1950 (age 74)
- Occupation(s): Author, businesswoman
- Known for: Philanthropy, writing
- Notable work: "New York, New York" and "Palm Beach People"
- Spouses: John W. Geary II (died 1995) Peter Green (divorced); Wilbur Ross (m. 2004)

Hilary Geary Ross (born July 4, 1950) is an American businesswoman, author, and philanthropist. She has been married to former Secretary of Commerce Wilbur Ross since 2004.

== Career ==
Ross has written two coffee-table books that feature photographs by Harry Benson. New York, New York was published in 2011 and Palm Beach People was published in 2014. The books feature intimate portraits of high-profile residences, and people in politics, Hollywood, fashion, art, sports, finance, and philanthropy. Ross knew the majority of the book's subjects personally. Some of Ross’ favorite photographs include one of Hugh Jackman, the architect Peter Marino, Dr. Oz, Evelyn and Leonard Lauder, President Donald Trump and the First Lady Melania Trump. Proceeds from the sales of the books are donated to The Preservation Foundation of Palm Beach.

Ross is the Society Editor for Quest, and wrote a Palm Beach column for New York Social Diary, which featured her own photographs. Her feature stories have included coverage of art exhibits including "Recapturing the West: The Collection of William I. Koch". She also wrote a monthly column for Quest called, "Appearance column” for 17 years.

== Philanthropy ==
Ross is a philanthropist in New York, Palm Beach, and Washington D.C. She currently sits on the Honorary Board of the Boys Club of New York, where she has served since 1983. She served as President of The Women's Board from 1988-1990 and was involved in uniting The Boys Club's men's and women's board. She was also on the board of the Women's Committee of Central Park Conservancy where she served as President in from 1994 to 1995. She continues to sit on the Honorary Board and attend their annual Frederick Law Olmsted Awards Luncheon.

Ross has been on the board of the Palm Beach Preservation Foundation since 2005 and was the Chairman of the Foundation's annual dance twice.

She sits on the Trustees' Council of the National Gallery of Art in Washington D.C. and the Board of the Ford Theater. She was formerly on the board of the Magritte Museum in Belgium.

Ross has been the President of the Blenheim Palace Foundation, USA since 2007. The Foundation helps with the restoration and preservation of Blenheim Palace in Woodstock, England, which is the birthplace of Winston Churchill.

== Awards ==
Hilary and Wilbur won The Preservation Foundation of Palm Beach's Ballinger Award in 2004 for the renovation of their 1939 Georgian Revival manor Windsong, which noted architect John L. Volk originally designed. The Ross’ won The Preservation Foundation of Palm Beach's Elizabeth L. and John H. Schuler Award in 2010 for the guesthouse they built on the property next door with the architect Thomas Kirchhoff and interior designer Mario Buatta.

== Personal life ==
Hilary's first husband, John W. Geary II, died in 1995; she would later marry and divorce Peter Green, a British investment banker. In 2004, she married industrialist and financier Wilbur L. Ross, Jr., who later served as the United States Secretary of Commerce under President Donald Trump. Forbes reported that Secretary Ross "discussed “competitive issues facing the U.S. aerospace market” with the CEO of Boeing in March 2017, a time when Ross’ wife owned nearly $3 million worth of stock in the company, according to an analysis of correspondence obtained by the ethics watchdog organization American Oversight."

== Books ==
2011: New York New York, powerHouse Books, ISBN 978-1576875889

2014: Palm Beach People, powerHouse Books, ISBN 978-1576877142
