= Phillip James Dodd =

British-American author, architect and educator (born 1972)

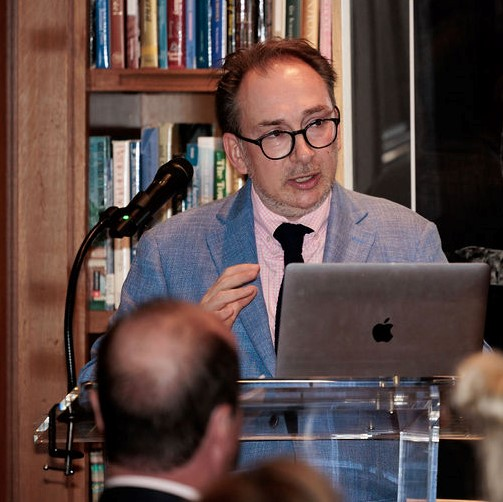
- Dodd receiving the Schuler Award
- Born: 1972 (age 53–54); Bury, Greater Manchester, England
- Education: Manchester School of Architecture; Prince of Wales Institute of Architecture; University of Notre Dame
- Occupations: Architect; author; educator
- Website: pjdbespokedesign.com

Phillip James Dodd (born 1972) is an author, educator, and architect who works in the New Classical architectural style. Born in England in 1972, he now lives and practices in the United States. After training with several well-known residential architectural firms in the United States, Dodd founded his own eponymous design firm in 2015, Phillip James Dodd, Bespoke Residential Design LLC in Greenwich, Connecticut. His designs can be found in California, Connecticut, New York, Florida, and as far away as India. Dodd has published several books on architecture and has been a contributing writer to Crayon, First Things, and Traditional Building magazines. He has lectured throughout the United States on the subject of classical and traditional architecture. His work has been featured in periodicals like Country Life, House & Garden, Quest, Traditional Home, Architectural Digest, Ocean Home, and The World of Interiors.

== Early life ==
Born in 1972 to a working-class family, Phillip James Dodd grew up in Bury, Greater Manchester, in North-West England. Nearby Manchester's mix of gothic, neoclassical and industrial buildings influenced his style of work, as well as the reawakening of classical and traditional design of architecture in England due to Prince Charles questioning the modernist doctrine being taught in architectural schools at the time. After high school and sixth form college, he attended the Manchester School of Architecture and received his degree at 23 years old. He went on to train at the Prince of Wales Institute of Architecture in London, which had just recently opened, where he studied classical and traditional design. Upon the advice of his professors at the Institute, he travelled to New York in 1996.

== Career ==
=== Architect ===
Upon arriving in New York in 1996, Dodd worked at the small boutique firm headed by Richard Sammons, Richard Franklin Architects PC, today known as Fairfax & Sammons Architects PC becoming one of Sammons' earliest apprentices. In 1999 he obtained a Master's degree in Architecture from the University of Notre Dame in Indiana, before returning to work at the office of Fairfax & Sammons. In 2003 he relocated to the architectural firm Wadia Associates in New Canaan, Connecticut where he served as Senior Designer and head of marketing until 2015.

Dodd is a fellow emeritus at The Institute of Classical Architecture and Art based in New York. From 2006 to 2009 he was the jury coordinator for the annual Arthur Ross Awards, and he has taught classes in Classical Design at the Institute of Classical Architecture and Art, as well as at the University of Notre Dame and at the Fashion Institute of Technology. He is an honorary member of the INTBAU College of Traditional Practitioners, an invited international professional body for practitioners in traditional architecture, under the auspices of His Royal Highness, The Prince of Wales (now King Charles III).

In 2015 Dodd established his own architectural firm Phillip James Dodd Bespoke Residential Design LLC in Greenwich, Connecticut. His company has designed homes in California, Connecticut, New York, and most recently, a Mediterranean-style, ocean-front house in Palm Beach, Florida. In Palm Beach he focuses on Anglo-Caribbean and Spanish-Mediterranean style homes for his New York and Connecticut based clients. Dodd's work overseas includes a villa in Bangalore, India, where he collaborated with renown decorator Alexa Hampton in designing a home for Manasi Kirloskar-Tata.

=== Author ===
In 2013 Dodd released his first coffee table book: The Art of Classical Details: Theory, Design & Craftsmanship. In the book about New Classical architecture Dodd focuses on classical and traditional homes on both sides of the Atlantic, as well as the craftsmanship of artisans who add to the design and realization of houses that are created by architects such as Quinlan Terry, G. P. Schafer Architect, Peter Pennoyer and Fairfax & Sammons. Two years later Dodd released his follow up The Art of Classical Details II: An Ideal Collaboration. As with his first book, the first half of the book consists of essays by sixteen professionals, this time discussing the concept of collaboration in architecture and the creation of buildings, while the second half focuses on specific projects, providing evidence of a "New American Renaissance" in architecture. Period Homes wrote that the book "highlights the importance of the talented hands of many over the genius of few."

Dodd is also the editor-at-large for The Classical Architecture Collection, a series of books published by Images Publishing Group on classical and traditional architecture, the first of which was titled The American House. He was previously the architectural editor at Venü magazine and was the consulting architect for WTNH-News Channel 8 in Connecticut. In 2021 Dodd released his book An American Renaissance: Beaux-Arts Architecture in New York City. The book has been featured in periodicals and newspapers such as Architectural Digest, the Associated Press, Interior Design (magazine), The New Criterion, Traditional Building, The Washington Post, and The World of Interiors.The foreword of the book was written by Julian Fellowes, the acclaimed creator of Downton Abbey and the HBO series The Gilded Age (TV series).

=== Speaker ===
Dodd lectures throughout the United States on the topic of traditional and classical design, including at the Preservation Foundation of Palm Beach, Shaker Heights Library in Cleveland, the Greenwich Library, the Institute of Classical Architecture and Art, the Georgian Society, and the Royal Oak Foundation, The National Arts Club, University Club and the Union Club in New York. Dodd has participated in numerous podcasts, including First Things, Stibling's New York, Untapped New York, and Broadway at the Russian Tea Room. In 2016 he was invited by The New York Times to organize and moderate a panel on classic style architecture in today's world, at the Architectural Digest Design Show in New York City. In 2023 Dodd gave the prestigious John G Winslow lecture in the Great Hall of The Breakers in Newport. This was followed by a presentation that was broadcast on C-SPAN as part of their American History Lecture Series He has also presented at the New York Knickerbocker Club, Lotos Club, the Union Club of the City of New York, and the Union League of Philadelphia. He also presented to the Greenwich Village Society for Historic Preservation. Dodd gave a presentation to the membership of the famous Lockwood-Mathews Mansion in Norwalk, CT.

=== Other ===
In 2021 Dodd was appointed as a member of the Greenwich Historic District Commission, which reviews proposed changes to structures and landscapes within the Historic Districts and promotes the concept of preserving historic structures and landscapes in the Town of Greenwich.

In 2022 Dodd received the prestigious Schuler Award presented by the Preservation Foundation of Palm Beach for a new Spanish Mediterranean-style house he designed in the Estate section of Palm Beach, and the Mizner Award in 2024.

In 2022 and in 2023 Dodd was named one of the 50 Top Coastal Architects by Ocean Home Magazine.

== Published works ==
- The Art of Classical Details: Theory, Design & Craftsmanship, 2013, ISBN 1864708166
- The Art of Classical Details II: An Ideal Collaboration, 2015, ISBN 1864706015
- The Classical American House (editor-at-large), 2017, ISBN 1864706821
- An American Renaissance: Beaux-arts Architecture in New York City, 2021, ISBN 9781864706819
