= Francis Dodds (disambiguation) =

Francis Dodds was a US politician.

Francis Dod(d)s may also refer to:

- Francis Dodds (Irish Republican)
- Francis Dods, Scottish rugby player

== See also ==
- Francis Dodd (disambiguation)
- Dodds (surname)
