= Wilbur Ross =

American businessman (born 1937)

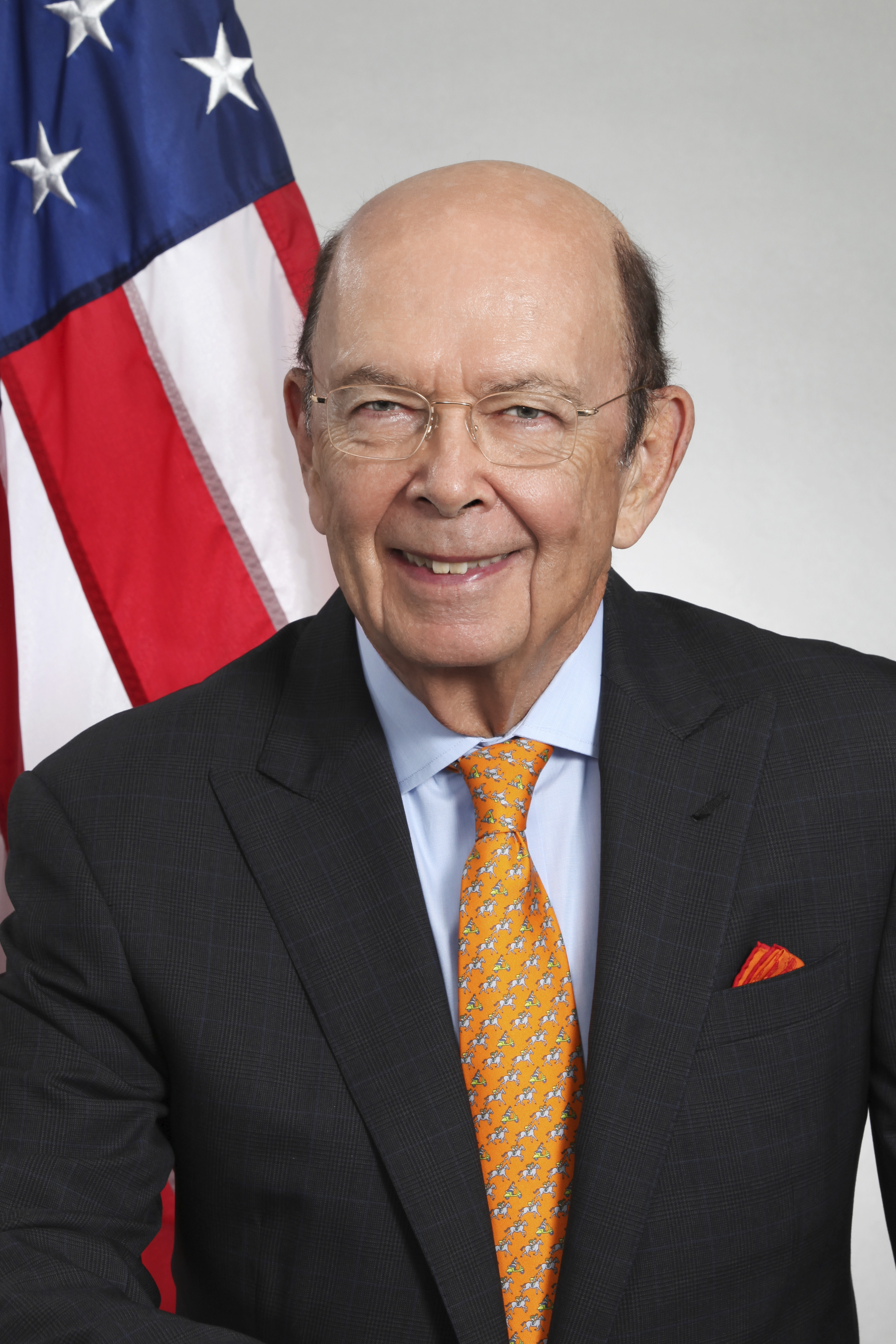
- Official portrait, 2017

39th United States Secretary of Commerce
- In office February 28, 2017 – January 20, 2021
- President: Donald Trump
- Deputy: Karen Dunn Kelley
- Preceded by: Penny Pritzker
- Succeeded by: Gina Raimondo

Second Gentleman of New York
- In role December 7, 1995 – December 31, 1998
- Lieutenant Governor: Betsy McCaughey
- Preceded by: Sara Lundine (Note: as second lady)
- Succeeded by: Anthony Ricci

Personal details
- Born: Wilbur Louis Ross Jr. November 28, 1937 (age 88) Weehawken, New Jersey, U.S.
- Party: Republican (2016–present)
- Other political affiliations: Democratic (before 2016)
- Spouse(s): Judith Nodine (m. 1961; div. 1995) Betsy McCaughey (m. 1995; div. 2000) Hilary Geary (m. 2004)
- Children: 2
- Education: Yale University (BA); Harvard University (MBA)
- Ross's voice Ross on civil and criminal penalties towards ZTE. Recorded March 7, 2017

Wilbur Louis Ross Jr. (born November 28, 1937) is an American businessman who served as the 39th United States secretary of commerce from 2017 to 2021. A member of the Republican Party, Ross was previously chairman and chief executive officer of WL Ross & Co from 2000 to 2017.

Ross ran the bankruptcy restructuring practice at N M Rothschild & Sons in New York beginning in the late 1970s. In the 1990s, Ross was an adviser to New York City mayor Rudy Giuliani on privatization, and was appointed by U.S. president Bill Clinton to the board of the U.S. Russia Investment Fund. In 2000, he left Rothschild to found WL Ross & Co. Ross was a banker known for acquiring and restructuring failed companies in industries such as steel, coal, telecommunications and textiles, later selling them for a profit after operations improved, a record that had earned him the moniker "King of Bankruptcy". Ross has been chairman or lead director of more than 100 companies operating in more than 20 countries. In 2017, Ross became commerce secretary in the Donald Trump administration; at age 79, Ross was the oldest first-time Cabinet appointee in U.S. history.

== Early life and education ==
Ross was born on November 28, 1937, in Weehawken, New Jersey, and grew up in nearby North Bergen, New Jersey. His father, Wilbur Louis Ross, was a lawyer who later became a judge, and his mother, Agnes (née O'Neill), of Irish descent, was valedictorian at Sacred Heart Academy in Hoboken and taught third grade in North Bergen for 40 years.

Ross attended Xavier High School, a Catholic school, and college-preparatory school in Manhattan. He ran track and was captain of the rifle team. He graduated in 1955. In 1959, he received a bachelor's degree from Yale College, his father's alma mater. At Yale, Ross edited one of the literary magazines and worked at the radio station. His dream was to be a writer. He enrolled in an English course that required writing a thousand words by 10 a.m. every day; after two weeks, he ran out of things to write about and dropped the course. His faculty adviser at Yale helped him get his first summer job on Wall Street. In 1961, he received a Master of Business Administration degree at Harvard Business School.

== Business career ==
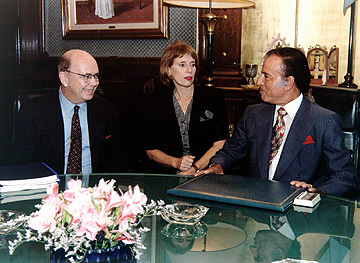
Ross with Carlos Menem in 1997

=== Early career ===
In 1963, he joined what became Wood, Struthers & Winthrop. There, he liquidated the portfolio of its venture capital affiliate.

He then worked for Faulkner, Dawkins & Sullivan, an institutional securities research company, where he rose to become president of its investment banking operation. The firm was sold to what became Shearson Lehman.

=== Rothschild Investments ===
In 1976, Ross began his 24-year employment with the New York City office of Rothschild & Co, where he ran the bankruptcy restructuring advisory practice. By 1998, Ross was involved in eight of the 25 biggest bankruptcies to date, including Drexel Burnham Lambert, Texaco, Public Service of New Hampshire (now Eversource Energy), and Eastern Air Lines.

In the 1980s, Donald Trump's three casinos in Atlantic City were under threat of foreclosure from lenders. Ross, who was then the senior managing director of Rothschild & Co, represented investors in the casino. Along with Carl Icahn, Ross convinced bondholders to strike a deal that allowed Trump to keep control of the casinos.

=== WL Ross & Co. ===
In November 1997, under Rothschild & Co, Ross started a $200 million fund to invest in distressed securities. In its first year, it earned a 15.2% return. In April 2000, just before the dot-com bubble burst, Ross founded WL Ross & Co and raised $450 million to buy the fund from Rothschild and make additional investments. By 2003, the fund had averaged a 30% return.

In 2006, Ross sold WL Ross & Co to Amvescap (now Invesco).

==== International Steel Group (ISG) ====
In February 2002, WL Ross & Co founded International Steel Group. He first agreed to buy the assets of bankrupt Ling-Temco-Vought for $325 million, paying $11 per ton of capacity when other firms were trading for $200 per ton of capacity. A few weeks later, George W. Bush slapped a 30% tariff on many types of imported steel. A year later, WL Ross & Co acquired the assets of bankrupt Bethlehem Steel. As part of the bankruptcy reorganizations, these companies shifted their huge pension liabilities to the government-backed Pension Benefit Guaranty Corporation.

Ross had support from the United Steelworkers, negotiating a deal to save some jobs.

In April 2005, WL Ross & Co sold International Steel Group to Mittal Steel Company for $4.5 billion, half in cash and half in stock, and made 12.5 times its original investment. Ross personally made a $260 million profit on his $3 million investment and gained a seat on the board of directors of Mittal Steel.

==== International Textile Group (ITG) ====
After outbidding Warren Buffett, who offered $579 million, WL Ross & Co acquired Burlington Industries for $620 million and combined it with Cone Mills in 2004 to form International Textile Group.

In 2005, Ross acquired 77.3% of Safety Components International for $51.2 million.

In October 2006, Ross had International Textile Group acquire Safety Components International. Ross controlled both companies and in February 2014, Ross paid $81 million to settle a lawsuit brought by shareholders that Ross breached his fiduciary duty when structuring the merger. International Textile Group was acquired by private equity firm Platinum Equity in 2016.

==== International Automotive Components Group (IAC) ====
International Automotive Components Group was formed in 2006 by WL Ross & Co and investment funds managed by Franklin Templeton Investments. In 2006, the company acquired the European operations of Lear Corporation and in 2007, it acquired Lear's North American interiors operations. In 2005–2007, IAC purchased several divisions of Collins & Aikman. In September 2005, investors led by Ross invested $100 million in Oxford Automotive for 25% of the company. In 2006, Oxford merged with Wagon Automotive.

==== International Coal Group (ICG) ====
WL Ross & Co founded International Coal Group in 2004 after acquiring the assets of several bankrupt coal companies. The United Mine Workers of America protested the reorganization as it led to changes in health care and pensions for the existing employees.

In 2006, the Sago Mine disaster, an explosion in a coal mine indirectly owned by International Coal Group, likely caused by a lightning strike, led to the deaths of 12 miners. The mine had 12 roof collapses in 2005, and U.S. Department of Labor data showed 208 citations for safety violations in that same period, including 21 times for build-up of toxic gases. Miners and their families accused Ross of ignoring safety violations. Ross defended his company's management of the mine.

In 2011, Arch Coal acquired International Coal Group for $3.4 billion.

==== Navigator Gas ====
By January 2016, WL Ross & Co was the "biggest investor" in Navigator Gas, a liquefied gas shipping company.

=== Overstating of net worth ===
In February 2017, Forbes reported that Ross has a net worth of $2.5 billion. Financial disclosure forms filed by Ross after his nomination as Commerce Secretary showed less than $700 million in assets, and Forbes later revised his net worth to $600 million.

=== Grift allegations ===
In August 2018, Forbes reported that Ross's business partners and workers accused Ross of illicitly siphoning or stealing a total of $120 million.

In December 2017, a report by two Irish financial analysts, commissioned by Luke Ming Flanagan, an Irish member of the European Parliament, accused Ross of insider trading as part of a 2014 sale of shares in the Bank of Ireland by WL Ross & Co.

=== Overcharging of fees ===
In August 2016, Ross agreed to reimburse investors $11.8 million and pay a fine of $2.3 million to settle a U.S. Securities and Exchange Commission probe into the overcharging of fees by WL Ross & Co. The company had self-reported the issue and did not admit any liability.

On August 7, 2018, five former WL Ross & Co. employees and investors claimed the firm was charging its investors fees on money it had lost, including allegedly charging fees on one investment that was essentially worthless.

== Secretary of Commerce (2017–2021) ==
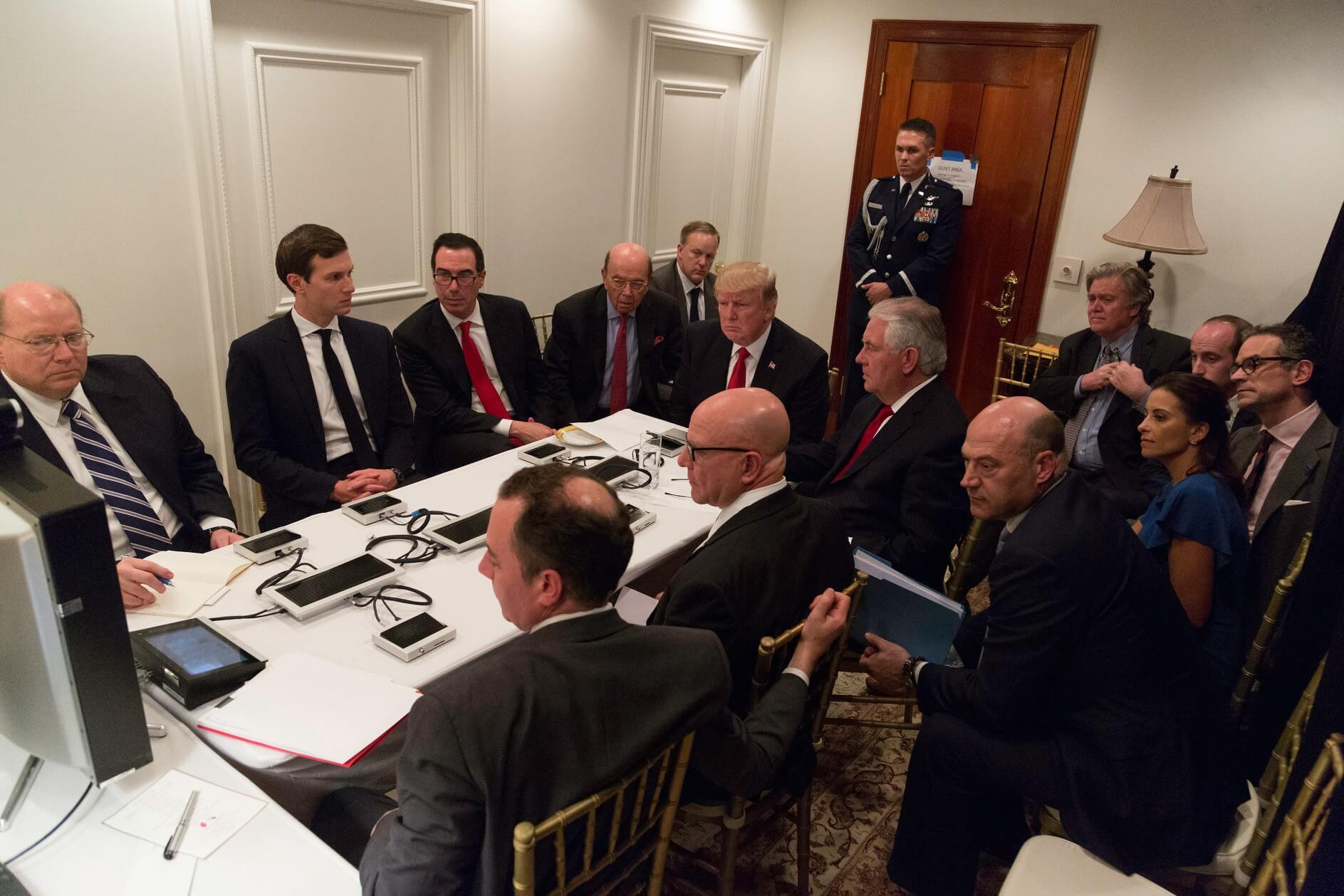
Secretary Ross during the April 2017 Shayrat missile strike operation

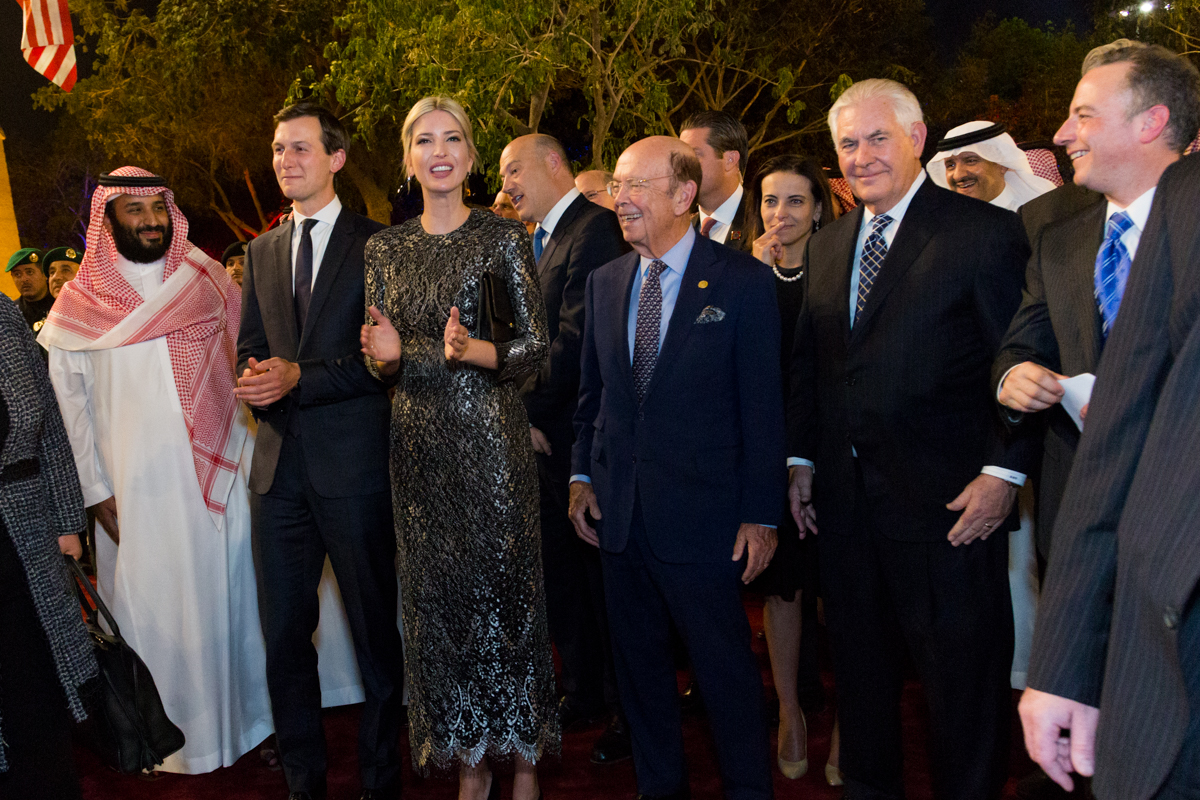
Ross in Riyadh, Saudi Arabia, May 2017

=== Nomination and confirmation ===
On November 30, 2016, then-President-elect Donald Trump announced that he would nominate Ross for Secretary of Commerce. On February 27, 2017, the Senate confirmed Ross in a 72–27 vote. Ross was sworn into office on February 28, 2017.

Ross took office at the age of 79, making him the oldest first-time Cabinet appointee in U.S. history. The previous record-holder was another Secretary of Commerce, Philip Klutznick, who took office in 1980 at the age of 72.

=== Trade issues ===
==== UK trade post-Brexit ====
In December 2016, after being designated by Trump as his nominee to lead the Commerce Department, Ross said in a speech to Cypriot financiers that Brexit was a "God-given opportunity" for other countries, such as Ireland and Germany, to draw business away from the United Kingdom's financial services industry. In 2017, Ross said that a trade deal with the UK was a low priority for the Trump administration; however, he outlined possible terms. No U.S. trade deal with the UK was concluded, although Ross and Treasury Secretary Steve Mnuchin stated in January 2020 that they hoped to have an "easy" agreement with the UK that year.

==== Tariffs and trade wars ====
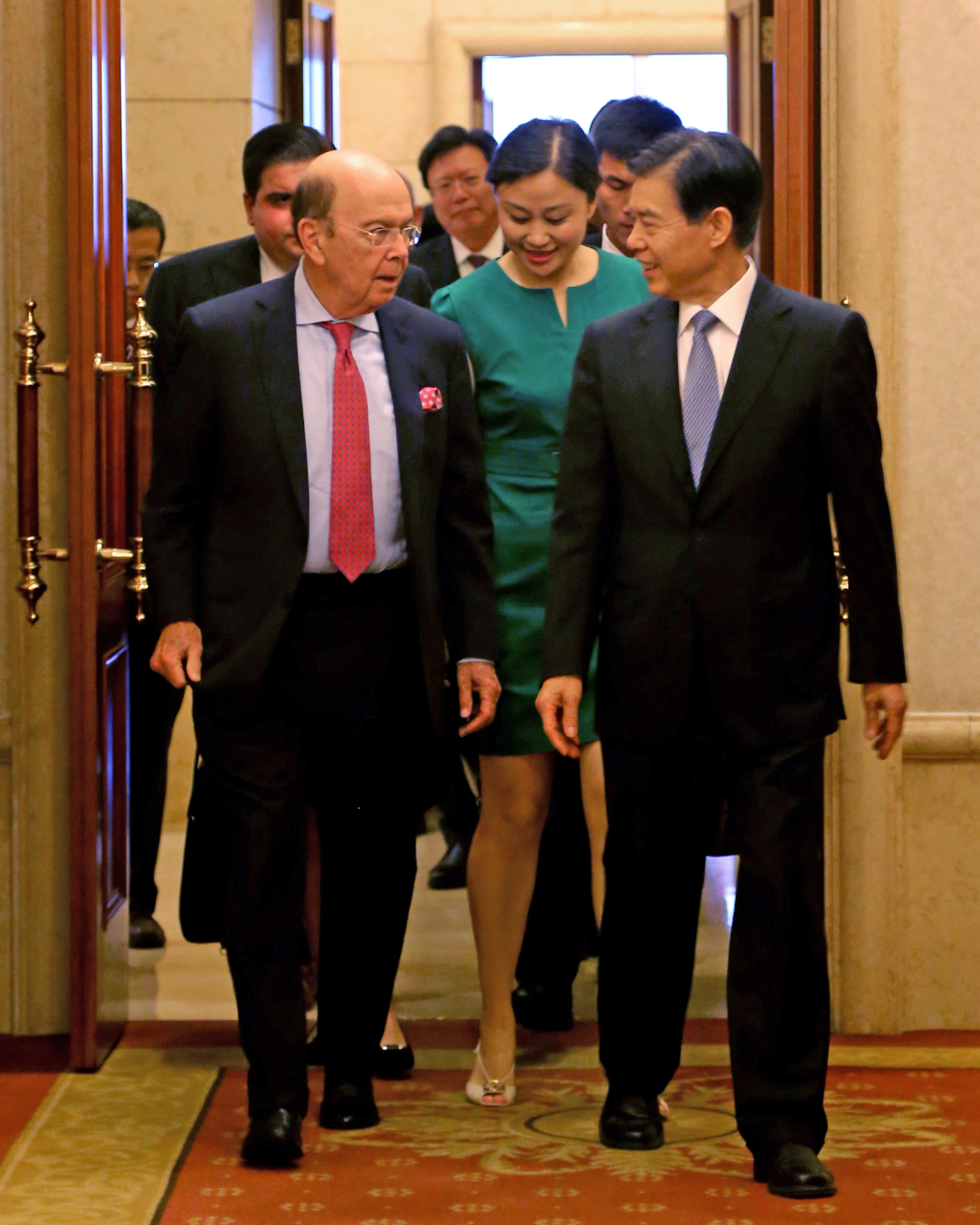
Ross with China's Commerce Minister Zhong Shan (right)

In September 2017, Ross traveled to Beijing as part of efforts to de-escalate trade tensions between the United States and China. In February 2018, the Commerce Department recommended an increase of tariffs in aluminum and steel imports. On March 1, 2018, Trump implemented a 25% tariff on steel and a 10% tariff on aluminum imports. In September 2018, Ross said that the tariffs are meant to "modify China's behavior".

In 2018, under Trump and Ross, the U.S. imposed tariffs on the import of steel and aluminum from the European Union, Canada, and Mexico. Ross dismissed concerns that the tariffs would increase costs to U.S. consumers, harm the U.S. economy, and damage relations with U.S. allies, saying that tariffs were "blips on the radar screen" and that the EU "will get over this in due course." He also dismissed concerns over EU retaliatory tariffs. In November 2019, Ross indicated that the Trump administration might now also impose tariffs on imports of automobiles from the EU; in January 2020, however, Ross said that the Trump administration might still impose tariffs on European cars despite ongoing trade talks. Also in January 2020, Ross threatened retaliation if the EU adopted a proposed carbon tax, comparing it to a proposed EU digital services tax, to which the administration has also threatened tariffs in response.

=== Ban of Huawei ===
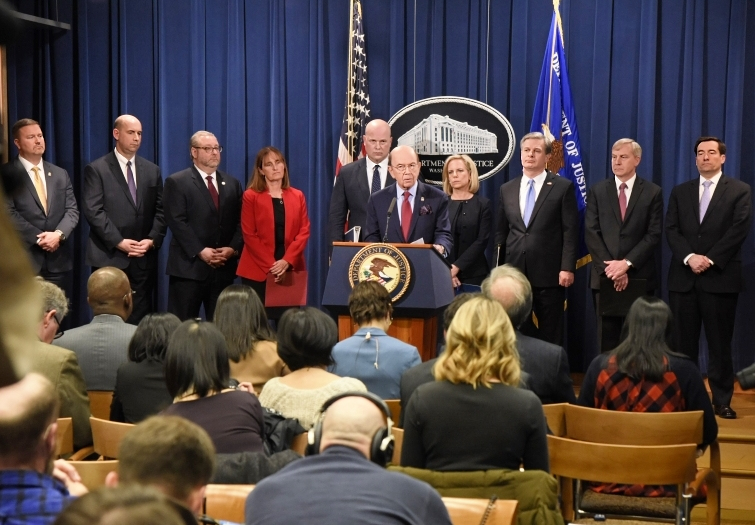
U.S. Department of Commerce, U.S. Department of Justice, Department of Homeland Security and Federal Bureau of Investigation announce 23 criminal charges against PRC's Huawei and Wanzhou Meng.

In January 2019, Ross was present with other American politicians when 23 criminal charges were announced against Huawei and its CFO Meng Wanzhou, including financial fraud, money laundering, conspiracy against the United States, industrial espionage, mail and wire fraud, obstruction of justice and violation of sanctions against Iran. In July 2019, Ross stated that the United States will keep Huawei on its blacklist but will allow licensed sales.

=== Accusations of being out of touch ===
In May 2017, Ross accompanied Trump on his first foreign visit, to Saudi Arabia, where Ross generated controversy after heralding the president's visit as a success due to a lack of protests, unaware that the Saudis had banned public protest and demonstrations since 2011.

During the 2018–19 federal government shutdown, Ross was criticized as being out of touch with average American citizens after expressing bewilderment about why furloughed, unpaid workers and contractors would choose to visit food banks rather than apply for a personal loan.

=== Non-disclosures ===
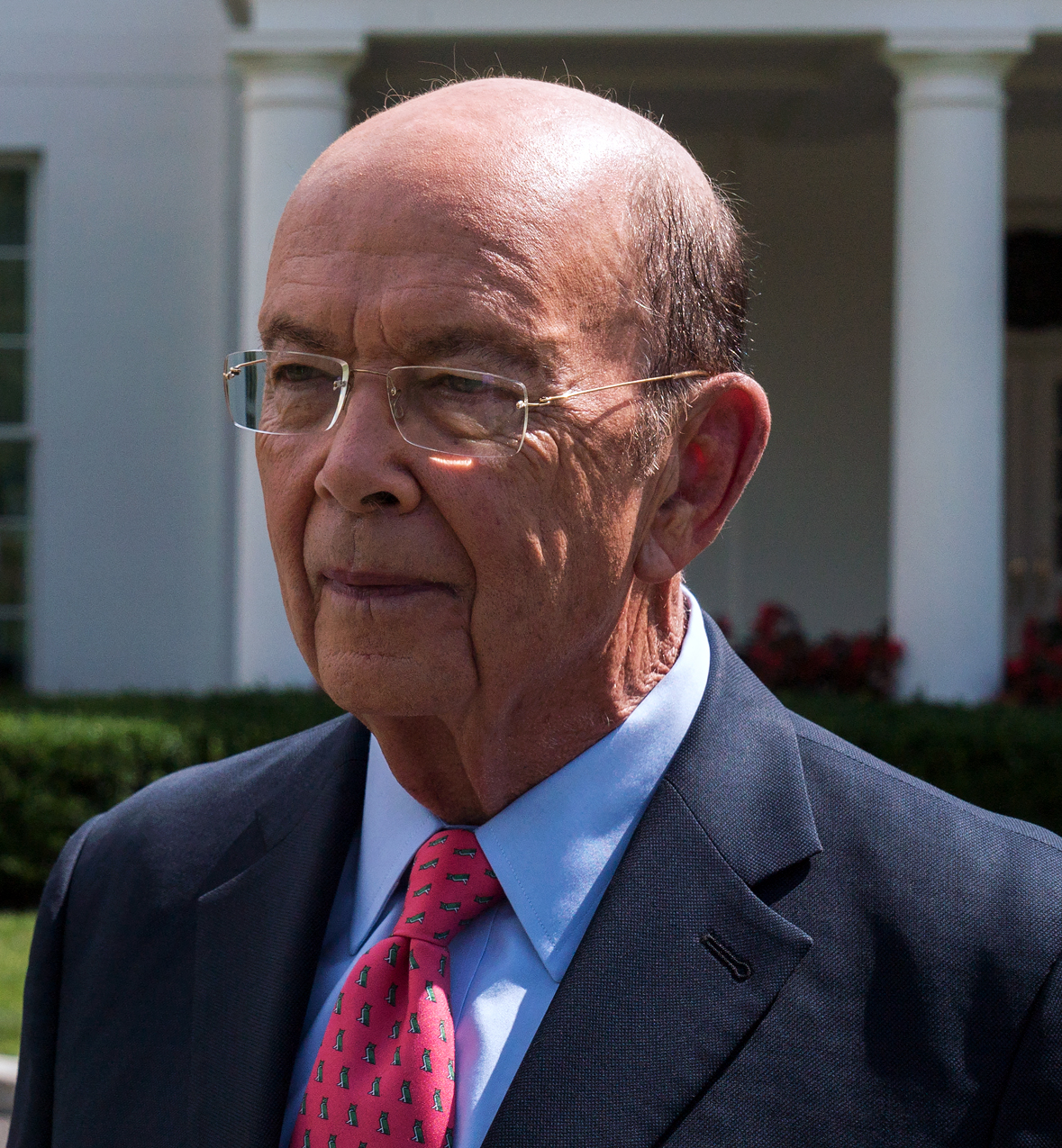
The leaked documents revealed that Secretary of Commerce Wilbur Ross holds stakes in businesses connected to sanctioned Russian oligarchs, which he did not disclose during his confirmation hearings.

In February 2019, Ross's financial disclosure was rejected by the Office of Government Ethics after he reported that he had sold bank stock when in fact he held on to them.

Ross failed to disclose a lawsuit from ex-business partner David Storper on his financial disclosure forms. Ross settled the lawsuit for $9 million after being subpoenaed for information that he did not want to disclose.

=== Conflicts of interest from failure to divest ===
In June 2018, an investigation by Forbes found that Ross, while Secretary of Commerce, owned "stakes in companies co-owned by the Chinese government, a shipping firm tied to Vladimir Putin's inner circle, a Cypriot bank reportedly caught up in the Robert Mueller investigation, and that Ross had failed to divest his financial holdings, instead putting them in a trust for his family members, contradicting Ross's written statement in November 2017 that he had divested all his financial holdings. Ross may have broken the law in doing so. These holdings posed a conflict of interest for Ross, as the Trump administration was in a position to affect the value of the holdings.

Ross was confirmed by the Senate in February 2017 and he agreed to sell his stocks before the end of May 2017. In July 2018, it was reported that Ross divested from his stock in Invesco, originally worth between $10 million and $50 million, in December 2017. Between the end of May and the sale date in December, the value of Ross's holdings in Invesco increased by between approximately $1.2 million to $6 million, depending on the number of shares he owned, which was not disclosed. Ross said that he "mistakenly believed that all [his] previously held Invesco stock was sold". On July 13, 2018, after he received a letter from the government's top ethics watchdog warning of "potential for a serious criminal violation", Ross announced that he will sell all his remaining stock.

In October 2018, documents showed that Ross had participated in a meeting with executives from Chevron Corporation where they discussed oil and gas developments, tax reform and trade issues. Ross's wife owned a stake in Chevron worth at least $250,000 at the time.

In October 2020, it was reported that Ross had continued to serve on the board of a Chinese joint venture until January 2019 (which was nearly two years into his tenure as Secretary of Commerce); at the same time, the United States and China were engaged in a trade war.

=== Insider trading allegations ===
While Secretary of Commerce, Ross shorted at least five stocks. In June 2018, it was revealed that Ross shorted stock after he knew of an upcoming report with information that would adversely affect the company but before the story was published. Ross later closed out the position at a substantial profit after the story was published. Ethics experts said that the shorting was alarming given that federal office-holders are prohibited from profiting on nonpublic information. Ross denied that he had engaged in insider trading. Ross had shorted two additional stocks in June 2018 and two additional stocks in July 2018.

=== 2020 Census citizenship question ===
As Secretary of Commerce, Ross oversaw the Census Bureau and the 2020 Census. In December 2017, he approved sending, in the form of a letter (which was originally drafted by Thomas Hofeller, a noted anti-immigrant political figure) that was later copied by James Uthmeier into a memo, a request to the Department of Justice to add a question to the Census for the first time since the 1940s asking about the U.S. citizenship status of the members of the responding household. Specifically, Ross sought to amend the decennial Census to add the controversial question: "Is this person a citizen of the United States?"

New York solicitor general Barbara Underwood led a lawsuit filed by 18 states and many cities to attempt to stop the Trump administration from adding a citizenship question on the 2020 Census. The Department of Justice supported the Department of Commerce. U.S. federal judge Jesse M. Furman ruled against the Department of Justice and Wilbur Ross, stating that if the trial is delayed the appeals process may not be done by summer 2019, the printing deadline of the census. Furman blocked the census question proposal on January 15, 2019, saying Ross had violated a "veritable smorgasbord" of federal rules, asserting Ross and his aides made false or misleading statements under oath and that he sought to add the question to the Census based on a pretext. The House of Representatives held Ross in contempt of Congress and accused Ross of lying about the citizenship question's origins. Specifically, Ross had testified under oath that the addition of the question was prompted by DOJ when in fact he had made the request via the Hofeller letter he had transmitted. It became known in July 2021 that the Justice Department inspector general had determined Ross had misled Congress, but the Trump Justice Department declined to prosecute him.

==== Contempt of Congress ====
Ross and the Trump administration refused to comply with a congressional subpoena, issued by the House Oversight Committee, for documents regarding efforts to add a citizenship question to the 2020 Census. After Trump asserted executive privilege over the subpoenaed documents, the House Oversight Committee voted to hold Ross and Attorney General William Barr in criminal contempt of Congress, with the committee's chairman saying that Ross and Barr had "blatantly obstructed our ability to do congressional oversight." In June 2019, the House held Barr and Ross in contempt of Congress on a mostly party-line 230–198 vote; this was only the second time in U.S. history that a sitting Cabinet member was held in contempt. The vote signified an escalation of the House of Representatives' battles with the Trump White House over congressional oversight, but was largely symbolic as Trump's Justice Department did not act on the criminal citation.

==== Supreme Court decision ====
On June 27, 2019, the Supreme Court, in Department of Commerce v. New York, left the citizenship question blocked from the 2020 census, in part because of the government's explanation for why it was added. In the Supreme Court opinion, there was a significant mismatch between Secretary Ross's decision to add the question, and his stated reason that the question would support Department of Justice's Voter Rights Act.

=== Ownership in Navigator Gas ===
In November 2017, leaked documents known as the Paradise Papers showed that, during his confirmation hearings, Ross had failed to clearly disclose a financial interest in Navigator Gas, a shipping company which transports petrochemicals for Russian gas and petrochemicals company Sibur. Ross had failed to clearly disclose ties to Russian interests during his confirmation hearings. While his confirmation was pending, Ross promised in a letter to the Office of Congressional Ethics to cut ties "with more than 80 financial entities in which he has interests". This letter played a key role in securing his confirmation. However, according to the leaked documents, while he did divest some holdings, he did not disclose the full extent of those he retained.

Speaking about his financial ties to Navigator, Ross said the media was making "a lot more out of it than it deserves" and "There is nothing wrong with it. The fact that it happens to be called a Russian company doesn't mean there is any evil in it." A spokesman for Ross stated that Ross has never met Shamalov, Timchenko or Mikhelson and that Ross "recuses himself from any matters focused of transoceanic shipping vessels, but has been generally supportive of the administration's sanctions of Russian and Venezuelan entities".

=== Dysfunction of the Department of Commerce ===
In July 2019, Politico reported that the Commerce Department under Ross reached "new heights of distraction"; an outside source, as well as multiple senior staffers, described Ross as "seen as kind of irrelevant" and morale at the department as "very low because there's not a lot of confidence in the secretary." Ross allegedly left his department leaderless due to the large amounts of time spent in the White House trying to win support from President Trump. Also, Ross allegedly tended to fall asleep in meetings to the extent that senior staffers avoided putting him in critical meetings where he could fall asleep. Reports of Ross's inability to stay awake have gone back as far as May 2017, where in a meeting in Riyadh with the Arab-Islam-American Summit during President Donald Trump's speech, Ross appeared to have been completely asleep.

=== NOAA/Hurricane Dorian controversy ===
On September 1, 2019, President Donald Trump made the incorrect claim that Hurricane Dorian presented a major threat to Alabama; minutes later the Birmingham, Alabama, branch of the National Weather Service (NWS) (which is under the National Oceanic and Atmospheric Administration (NOAA), which is part of the Commerce Department) reported that Alabama was not at risk. The New York Times reported that Ross had threatened, a few days late, to fire high-level NOAA staff unless the agency disavowed its contradiction of Trump's false claim, leading to a September 6 NOAA statement from an unidentified spokesperson endorsing Trump's position and declaring that the NWS Birmingham's contradiction of Trump was incorrect. The Commerce Department denied that Ross had threatened to fire "any NOAA staff over forecasting and public statements about Hurricane Dorian." Later reporting said that Ross had made the call from Greece, where he was traveling, after being told to "fix the problem" by acting White House chief of staff Mick Mulvaney, reportedly on Trump's orders. NOAA's disavowal prompted an outcry from scientists and others, who said that the agency's failure to back its hurricane forecasters damaged its credibility.

A subsequent report by the National Academy of Public Administration, commissioned by NOAA, found that NOAA's leadership violated the agency's scientific integrity policy by releasing a statement backing Trump's false statement about Hurricane Dorian's path. The Office of Inspector General (OIG) of the Commerce Department separately investigated the incident and concluded that the Commerce Department "ran a 'flawed process' that did not sufficiently engage NOAA and went against the interests of the agency and the National Weather Service." In a July 2020 letter to Ross, Inspector General Peggy Gustafson expressed "deep concern" that the department was blocking OIG from publicly releasing its report by asserting "amorphous and generalized privileges." The letter prompted Democratic Senator Maria Cantwell, the ranking member of the Senate Commerce, Science, and Transportation Committee, to call upon Ross to "immediately cease this campaign to keep the public in the dark." The House Science Committee also probed Ross's role in the issuance of the NOAA statement.

=== Coronavirus pandemic ===
In a January 30, 2020, interview with Maria Bartiromo of Fox Business, when asked if the COVID-19 outbreak in China would threaten the U.S. economy, Ross said, "I think it will help to accelerate the return of jobs to North America ... I don't want to talk about a victory lap over a very unfortunate, very malignant disease ... the fact is, it does give business yet another thing to consider when they go through their review of their supply chain." The outbreak became a pandemic, and caused a major recession, with 10 million Americans filing unemployment claims and unemployment rising more than during the entirety of the Great Recession.

=== 2020 Census count early completion ===
Due to delays and operation challenges brought about by the COVID-19 pandemic, Ross and U.S. Census Bureau director Steven Dillingham announced on April 13, 2020, that they would extend the timeframe for field data collection and self-response for the 2020 United States Census to October 31, 2020. However, on August 3, 2020, the Census Bureau announced that they were moving this deadline up to September 30, 2020. Community advocates and former Census Bureau employees expressed concern that this shortened timeframe would result in poor-quality data and a significant undercount that would disproportionately affect traditionally hard-to-count groups such as ethnic minorities, young adults, and people living in rural areas.

On September 24, 2020, federal district court judge Lucy Koh issued a preliminary injunction against the plan to end counting on September 30 rather than the scheduled October 31, saying the Commerce Department "never articulated a satisfactory explanation." She also blocked a plan to deliver the count results to the White House by December 31, rather than the original April 2021 delivery date when Trump might be out of office. On the next business day, Ross announced the count would end October 5, as the administration appealed Koh's decision to the 9th circuit. Koh subsequently called the October 5 end date "a violation" of her court order and prepared to begin contempt proceedings against Ross and the Commerce Department. The appeals court rejected the administration's appeal, and the Census Bureau announced on October 2 that the count would continue until October 31. However, the counted ultimately ended at 11:59 PM on October 15 after the administration appealed to the Supreme Court, which issued a 7–1 ruling allowing the count to finish early.

== Post-administration (2021–present) ==
On July 23, 2021, the Chinese government sanctioned Ross as part of "reciprocal counter-sanctions" after the U.S. government imposed sanctions on Hong Kong officials.

== Honors ==
In 1999, Ross was awarded the Order of Industrial Service Merit medal by South Korean president Kim Dae Jung for his assistance during the 1997 Asian financial crisis. He was awarded the American Irish Historical Society Gold Medal in 2014 in recognition of his work in Ireland and Irish-American causes. The Japanese government awarded Ross the Order of the Rising Sun, Gold and Silver Star, in recognition of his service as Chairman of the Board of New York's Japan Society, his work to promote and strengthen the Japanese economy, and his relief efforts after the 2011 Tōhoku earthquake and tsunami.

== Organizational memberships ==
Ross is a past director of the Turnaround Management Association and member of its hall of fame. Ross has been the vice-chairman of the board of Bank of Cyprus, the largest bank in Cyprus, after he and his investors invested €400 million in the bank in 2014. As of January 2012, Ross was the leader (or "Grand Swipe") of the secret Wall Street fraternity, Kappa Beta Phi. Ross served on the board of trustees of the Brookings Institution. He is also on the board of advisors of Yale School of Management and is a former board member of the Yale University Art Gallery. He served as International Counsel Member of the Musée des Arts Décoratifs, Paris, and President of the American Friends of the René Magritte Museum in Brussels. Ross has been on the board of directors of Navigator Gas since March 2012.

== Political views ==
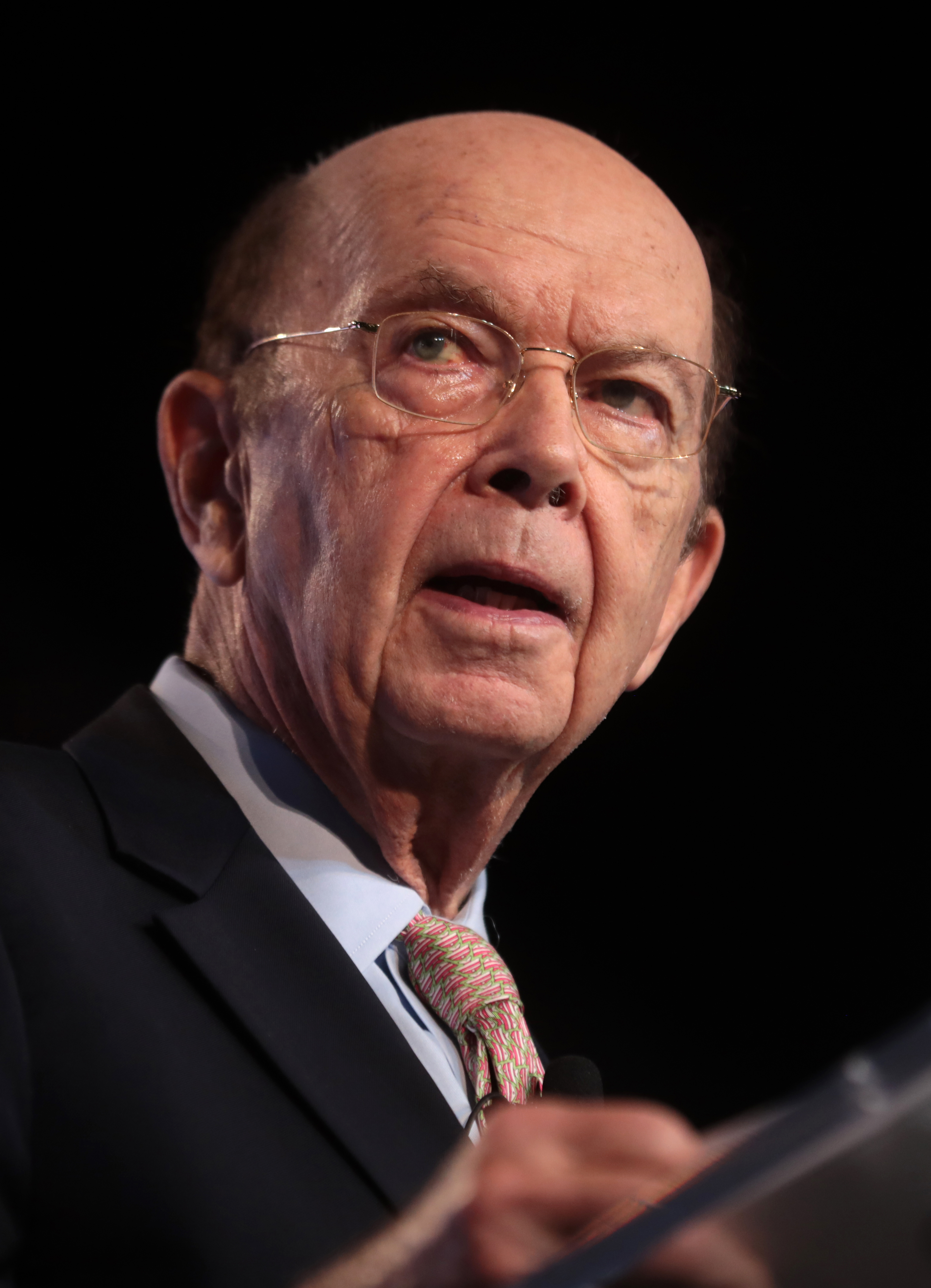
Ross speaking at a political conference in December 2018

=== Support for Democratic Party and switch ===
Although he was an early supporter of Donald Trump's presidential campaign, Ross was previously a registered Democrat, served as an officer of the New York State Democratic Committee, and held fundraisers for Democratic candidates at his apartment in New York City. He served under President Bill Clinton on the board of the U.S. Russia Investment Fund.

In January 1998, he funded $2.25 million in seed money into the campaign of his then-wife, Betsy McCaughey, who was seeking the Democratic nomination for governor of New York. Since at least 2011, Ross has donated to Republican candidates and organizations.

Ross became a registered Republican in November 2016.

=== Privatization ===
In the 1990s, New York City mayor Rudy Giuliani appointed Ross as his privatization advisor. He helped push to privatize the city's public broadcasting stations and the Port Authority of New York and New Jersey, and worked to sell off empty land lots to businesses.

=== Trade policy ===
Ross has described himself as "pro-sensible trade" and said that the U.S. government "should provide access to our markets to those countries who play fair, play by the rules and give everybody a fair chance to compete. Those who do not should not get away with it – they should be punished." Initially in favor of the Trans-Pacific Partnership, Ross has said that after examining the agreement, he found it was "not consistent with what was advertised".

In 2004, The Economist described Ross as a supporter of protectionism.

At the 2018 World Economic Forum in Davos, Ross responded to concerns of a trade war by noting that "There have always been trade wars. The difference now is U.S. troops are now coming to the ramparts."

== Personal life ==
Ross married Judith Nodine in 1961. They divorced in 1995. After the divorce, Nodine sued Ross for failing to transfer stock by the agreed-upon deadline and Ross counter-sued. They had two children, Jessica Colby Ross (b. 1962) and Amanda Colby Ross (b. 1965). Amanda attended the French Culinary Institute and founded a baking company, while Jessica worked for Sotheby's. In 1995, Ross married his second wife, Lieutenant Governor of New York Betsy McCaughey. They divorced in 2000. On October 9, 2004, Ross married his third wife, Hilary Geary Ross, a society writer for Quest magazine.

In December 2016, while his Manhattan penthouse apartment at The Briarcliffe was on the market for $21 million, Ross purchased a 10,000 square foot house in the Massachusetts Heights neighborhood of Washington, D.C., from Adrienne Arsht for $10,750,000. In 2018, he purchased a $3.2 million house in the Berkshires. He also owns two multimillion-dollar properties in Palm Beach, Florida.

Ross owns an art collection valued at $150 million that includes pieces ranging from Western surrealists to contemporary Eastern sculptures. Ross owns 25 works by René Magritte, valued at $100 million, including some of the artist's most valuable paintings, such as The Pilgrim.

=== Philanthropy ===
Ross donated $10 million for the construction of the new campus of Yale School of Management.

== See also ==
- List of people and organisations named in the Paradise Papers

Political offices
Preceded by Penny Pritzker	United States Secretary of Commerce; 2017–2021	Succeeded by Gina Raimondo
U.S. order of precedence (ceremonial)
Preceded by David Shulkin as Former U.S. Cabinet Member	Order of precedence of the United States as Former U.S. Cabinet Member	Succeeded by Ben Carson as Former U.S. Cabinet Member
