= Francis Dodd =

Francis Dodd may refer to:

- Francis Dodd (artist) (1874–1949), Welsh painter and draftsman
- Francis Dodd (general) (1899–1973), U.S. Army brigadier general who was interned by North Korean prisoners

== See also ==
- Frank Dodd (disambiguation)
- Francis Dodds (disambiguation)
- Dodd (surname)
