= Robert Dodd =

Robert or Bobby Dodd may refer to:

- Robert Dodd (baseball) (born 1973), American baseball player
- Robert Dodd (artist) (1748–1815), British marine painter
- Robert Dodd (footballer), English association footballer
- Robert F. Dodd (1844–1903), Canadian soldier who fought in the American Civil War
- Bobby Dodd (1908–1988), American football coach
