= Charles Dodd (disambiguation) =

Charles Dodd was an English historian.

Charles Dodd may also refer to:

- Charles Dod, Irish journalist and writer (1793–1855)
- C. H. Dodd (Charles Harold Dodd), Welsh theologian
- Charles J. Dodd, American lawyer, politician, and judge from New York
- Charles Edward Shuter Dodd, on List of ambassadors of the United Kingdom to Panama

== See also ==
- Charles Dodds, British biochemist
- Dodd (surname)
