= Dodds (surname) =

Dodds is a surname, and may refer to:

== People ==
=== In academia ===
- Sir Edward Charles Dodds, 1st Baronet (1899–1973), British biochemist
- J. Colin Dodds, academic
- E. R. Dodds (1893–1979), Irish classical scholar
- Harold W. Dodds (1889–1980), American educator
- Klaus Dodds (born 1969), geographer
- Stephen Hatfield Dodds (born 1969), Australian philosophical economist

=== In arts and entertainment ===
- Baby Dodds (1898–1959), American jazz drummer
- Christopher Dodds (born 1967), Canadian photographer
- Joanie Dodds, runner-up of America's Next Top Model, Cycle 6
- Johnny Dodds (1892–1940), American jazz clarinettist
- K. K. Dodds (born 1965), American actor
- Megan Dodds (born 1970), British actor

=== In government and politics ===
- Anneliese Dodds (born 1978), British politician
- Diane Dodds (born 1958), Northern Ireland politician
- Douglas Dodds-Parker (1909–2006), British politician
- Francis H. Dodds (1858–1940), American politician
- John Stokell Dodds (1848–1914), colonial administrator in Australia
- Nigel Dodds (born 1958), Northern Ireland politician
- Norman Dodds (1903–1965), British politician
- Ozro J. Dodds (1840–1882), American politician

=== In sport ===
==== Football (soccer) ====
- Billy Dodds (born 1969), Scottish footballer
- Davie Dodds (born 1958), Scottish footballer
- Jock Dodds (1915–2007), Scottish footballer
- Louis Dodds (born 1986), English footballer
- Rhian Dodds (born 1979), Scottish-Canadian soccer player

==== Other sports ====
- Daniel Dodds (born 2001), English footballer
- David John Dodds, athlete and jockey
- Ed Dodds, American football executive
- Jennifer Dodds (born 1991), Scottish curler
- John Dodds (motorcycle racer) (born 1943), Australian motorcycle road racer
- Mitchell Dodds (born 1989), Australian Rugby League player
- Norman Dodds (1876–1916), Australian cricketer
- Rachael Dodds (born 1994), Australian para-athlete
- Richard Dodds (born 1959), British field hockey player
- Trevor Dodds (born 1959), Namibian golfer
- Trevor Dodds (curler), Scottish curler
- Andrew Dodds (born 1991), Australian Figure Skater/Ice Dancer

=== In other fields ===
- Alfred Dodds (1842–1922), French general
- Isaac Dodds (1801–1881), British pioneer locomotive designer
- Jackson Dodds (1881–1961), Canadian scouting organiser
- John Mathieson Dodds (1905–1983), Scottish electrical engineer
- Leslie Dodds (1903–1975), English bridge player
- Lin Hatfield Dodds (1965), Australian social activist (also see Stephen Hatfield Dodds)
- Philip V.W. Dodds (1951–2007), audio engineer
- Robert Dodds (1893–1980), Canadian aviator
- Roy Edward Dodds (1893–1965), Detroit area military aviator
- W. O. H. Dodds (1867–1934), Canadian WW1 general

== Other uses ==
- Sandman (Wesley Dodds), a fictional character in the DC Comics universe
- DS Dodds played by Jason Watkins in the British crime drama television series McDonald & Dodds

== See also ==
- Dodd (surname)
- Dodds (disambiguation)
