= Stephen Dodds =

Stephen Dodds may refer to:

- Stephen Roxby Dodds (1881–1943), English lawyer and politician
- Stephen Hatfield Dodds, Australian philosophical economist
