= Dodd =

Dodd may refer to:

== Places ==
- Dodd (Buttermere), a fell near Red Pike in England
- Dodd (Lake District), a fell in Cumbria, England
- Dodd, Indiana, a community in the United States

== People ==
- Dodd (surname), people with the surname Dodd

== Other uses ==
- Dodd (hill), a British hill categorisation
- Dodd, Mead and Company, publishing company
- Dodd Hall, a building at Florida State University
- Dodd-Frank Street Reform and Consumer Protection Act (Pub.L. 111–203, H.R. 4173), commonly referred to as "Dodd–Frank", a U.S. federal government law passed as a response to the Great Recession

== See also ==
- DOD (disambiguation)
- Dodds (disambiguation)
- Doddy (disambiguation)
