= Dodds =

Dodds may refer to:

- Dodds (surname), people with the surname Dodds
- Dodds Range, a former name of the Xueshan Range on Taiwan Island
- Dodds, Iowa, a ghost town
- Dodds, Missouri, an unincorporated community
- Dodds, Ohio, a US unincorporated place
- Dodds Township, Jefferson County, Illinois, US
- Department of Defense Dependents Schools (DoDDS)
- Isaac Dodds and Son, a UK railway engine manufacturer

== See also ==
- Dods (disambiguation)
- Dod (disambiguation)
- Dodd (disambiguation)
