= Frank Dodd =

Frank Dodd may refer to:

- Frank J. Dodd (1938–2010), American businessman and politician
- Frank Howard Dodd (1844–1916), American publisher
- Frank Nelaton Dodd (1870–1943), American accountant

== See also ==
- Francis Dodd (disambiguation)
- Dodd–Frank, a banking reform statute
