= Lin Hatfield Dodds =

Australian politician

CEO, The Benevolent Society
- Incumbent
- Assumed office July 2021
- Preceded by: Jo Toohey

Associate Dean, ANZSOG
- In office 2019–2021

Deputy Secretary for Social Policy, Department of Prime Minister and Cabinet
- In office 2016–2019

National Director, UnitingCare Australia
- In office 2002–2016
- Preceded by: Libby Davies

Chair of the Australian Social Inclusion Board
- In office 2012–2013
- Preceded by: Patricia Faulkner AO

President of the Australian Council of Social Service
- In office 2005–2009
- Preceded by: Andrew McCallum
- Succeeded by: Simon Schrapel

Australian of the Year (ACT)
- In office 2008–2009
- Preceded by: Michael Milton
- Succeeded by: Mick Dodson

Personal details
- Born: 11 June 1965 (age 61)
- Spouse: Dr Steve Hatfield Dodds
- Children: 2
- Education: University of Canberra

Lin Hatfield Dodds (born 11 June 1965 as Linda Hatfield), Australian social policy expert and former Churchill Fellow, is the CEO of The Benevolent Society, Australia's first and oldest charity, and was the Deputy Secretary for Social Policy in the Department of Prime Minister and Cabinet, and former National Director of UnitingCare Australia and Chair of the Australian Social Inclusion Board.

== Early life and background ==
Educated at Page Primary School, Belconnen High School and Hawker College, Hatfield Dodds became active in the Uniting Church in Australia as a teenager. She has a master's degree in counseling psychology and has worked in the areas of drug rehabilitation, trauma, and abuse.

== Social work ==
She has served on a number of Boards. Hatfield Dodds was a Director of the Australian Centre for Christianity and Culture from 2003 to 2016. She was Board Chair at UnitingCare Kippax 2009-2016. She was Chair of The Australia Institute from 2011- 2016.

In 2004, Hatfield Dodds was awarded a Churchill Fellowship to examine the design and implementation of holistic poverty reduction strategies that address the underlying causes of social disadvantage.

After working in government and the community sector, she was appointed National Director of UnitingCare Australia in 2002, remaining until 2016. UnitingCare Australia is an agency of the Uniting Church in Australia. UnitingCare is one of the largest non-government providers of community services, with 1,600 community service delivery sites located across every State and Territory providing services to over 2 million people each year.

From 2004 to 2008, Hatfield Dodds was a member of the ACT Community Inclusion Board, serving as Chair from 2006 to 2008. From 2005 to 2009 she was President of the Australian Council of Social Service, the peak advocacy body representing people affected by poverty and inequality.

From 2012 to 2013 she was Chair of the Australian Social Inclusion Board, the main advisory body to Government on ways to achieve better outcomes for the most disadvantaged people in our community.

Hatfield Dodds has contributed to numerous government advisory bodies, including the Aged Care Sector Committee, the National Place Based Advisory Group and the National Youth Advisory and Consultative Forum, which advised the then Federal Minister for Children and Youth Affairs.

She was a participant in the Prime Minister's Economic Forum (2012), the Australian Government Tax Forum (2011) and the Prime Minister's 2020 Summit (2007). She was a member of the national Community Response Task Force advising the Deputy Prime Minister and Minister for Families, Housing, Community Services and Indigenous Affairs during the 2008 financial crisis.

Hatfield Dodds has been active in public debate, a frequent media commentator and conference speaker across the spectrum of social and economic issues relating to children, young people, and families; older Australians and reform of the not for profit sector.

== Federal government ==
In May 2016, Hatfield Dodds was announced as Deputy Secretary for Social Policy in the Department of Prime Minister and Cabinet, by the Secretary, Dr Martin Parkinson. She served until 2019.

== ANZSOG ==
From 2019 to 2021, Hatfield Dodds was an Associate Dean at the Australia and New Zealand School of Government.

== The Benevolent Society ==
In July 2021, Hatfield Dodds was announced as the CEO of The Benevolent Society, Australia's first and oldest charity.

== Politics ==
At the 2010 federal election, Hatfield Dodds was a candidate for political office for the Australian Senate in the Australian Capital Territory for the Australian Greens. She was defeated by long-serving Liberal Senator Gary Humphries.

== Awards and honours ==
Hatfield Dodds has received a number of awards in recognition of her contribution to social and economic policy, including an International Women's Day Award in 2002 and an ACT Australian of the Year award in 2008.
