= Dod (nickname) =

Dod or Doddie is a Scottish nickname, usually a diminutive or tee-name for "George".

People with the nickname include:

- Dod Brewster (1891–?), Scottish footballer
- George "Dod" Burrell (1921–2001), Scotland rugby union player, referee and administrator
- Dod Gray (c. 1909–1975), Scottish rugby union and professional rugby league footballer
- Dod Orsborne (1902–1957), Scottish seafarer
- Dod Procter (1890–1972), English woman painter
- Doddie Weir (1970–2022), Scottish international rugby union player
- Doddie Wood (1905–1989), Scottish international rugby union player

== See also ==
- Doddy (disambiguation), includes a list of people named Doddy
- Dody
