= Doddy =

Doddy may refer to:

- Doddy Édouard (born 1981), Mauritian footballer
- Doddy Gray (1880–1961), New Zealand rugby union player
- Doddy!, television show by English comedian Ken Dodd

== See also ==
- Dod (nickname), includes Doddie
- Dody, given name
