= Dode =

Dode may refer to:

== Geography ==
- Dode, Jalandhar, India
- Dode, Kent, United Kingdom

== People ==
- Dode, Abbess of Saint Pierre de Reims
- Dode Criss
- Dode Paskert
- Guillaume Dode de la Brunerie
- Louis-Albert Dode (1875-1945), French botanist

== Other uses ==
- Dode (steamboat), a small inland steamboat that ran on Hood Canal and Puget Sound from 1898 to 1910
