= Wagon Automotive =

Wagon Automotive is an automotive parts company based in Birmingham, England.

The company is controlled by the American businessman Wilbur Ross and employs over 4,000 workers across Europe.

== Background ==
Wagon has its roots in Wagon Repairs, a business set up at the end of the First World War to maintain railway rolling stock.

The company was chosen by Ross as the foundation for a European car parts empire.

== Funding ==
In October 2008, trading of Wagon shares was halted following a significant downturn in the European car market. The company disclosed ongoing discussions with its lenders regarding financial support.

Wagon was unsuccessful in securing additional funding from its banking partners. The Royal Bank of Scotland and Lloyds TSB, both now under substantial government influence, declined to contribute €12 million to a €50 million funding package.

== See also ==
- Carisma Automotive
