= Dodi =

Dodi may refer to:

== People ==
- Douglas Moreira Fagundes, Brazilian football player known as Dodi
- Dodi Battaglia, Italian musician
- Dodi Fayed, Egyptian film producer and romantic partner of Princess Diana
- Dodi Lukébakio, Belgian footballer
- Dodi Protero, Canadian opera singer
- Dody, a list of people with the given name Dodi, Dodie or Dody
- Luca Dodi (born 1987), Italian cyclist
- Washington Joseph (born 1950), Brazilian basketball player known as Dodi

== Other ==
- Dodi Island, in Lake Volta, Ghana
- "Dođi", a 2021 song by Dino Merlin and Senidah
- "Dodi", a 2019 song by Shindy
- DoDI (US Department of Defense Instruction) – see (DoDI) 6130.03, 2018, section 5, 13f and 14m
- Sarazi language, sometimes referred to as Dodi after the Doda district, where it is spoken

== See also ==
- Pacifier (teether, soother), also called a Dodie
