= Do or Die =

Do or Die may refer to:

== Music ==
- Do or Die (group), hip hop group from Chicago

=== Albums ===
- Do or Die (Ant Banks album), and the title song
- Do or Die (Burn album), and the title song
- Do or Die (Dropkick Murphys album), and the title song
- Do or Die (Gospel Gangstaz album), and the title song
- Do or Die (Tim Dog album)
- Do or Die (Viking album), and the title song
- Do or Die: Diary 1982, by Nico
- Do or Die, by The BossHoss band
- Do or Die, by Eureka Machines

=== Songs ===
- "Do or Die" (30 Seconds to Mars song)
- "Do or Die" (Grace Jones song)
- "Do or Die" (Super Furry Animals song)
- "Do or Die", by 3OH!3, from the album Omens
- "Do or Die", by Amaranthe, from the album Manifest.
- "Do or Die", by The Flatliners, from the album Destroy to Create
- "Do or Die", by Forever the Sickest Kids, from the album The Weekend: Friday
- "Do or Die", by Hardline, from the album II
- "Do or Die", by The Human League, from the album Dare
- "Do or Die", by Wigwam, from the album Nuclear Nightclub

== Film ==
- Do or Die (film), by Andy Sidaris
- Do or Die, linked from List of Bollywood films of 1944
- Do or Die, starring Polly Shannon
- Do or Die (serial), film serial
- Do or Die (miniseries), Australian miniseries

== Other ==
- Nickname for Bedford–Stuyvesant, Brooklyn
- "Do or die", an episode in the 2021 season Survivor 41

== See also ==
- DOD (disambiguation)
- Doe or Die, by rapper AZ
- Publish or perish, aphorism describing the pressure to publish in academia
