= Richard Sammons =

American architect (born 1961)

- Born: May 18, 1961 (age 65); Columbus, Ohio, U.S.
- Education: Denison University; University of Virginia (MArch)
- Occupation: Architect

Richard Sammons (born May 18, 1961, in Columbus, Ohio) is an American architect, architectural theorist, visiting professor, and chief designer of Fairfax & Sammons Architects with offices in New York City, New York and Palm Beach, Florida. The firm has an international practice specializing in classical and traditional architecture, interior design and urban planning. Sammons was instrumental in the reemergence of classical design as a major movement in America through his designs as well as his work as an instructor at the Prince of Wales Institute in Britain in 1992-3 and as a founding member of the Institute of Classical Architecture in 1991. From 1996 to 2004, the Fairfax & Sammons office also served as the headquarters for the noted American architecture critic Henry Hope Reed Jr. (1915) and Classical America, the organization he founded in 1968. In 2013, Fairfax & Sammons received the Arthur Ross Award for Lifetime Achievement in Architecture, an award created to recognize and celebrate excellence in the classical tradition.

== Early life and education ==
Sammons was born in Columbus, Ohio and received his bachelor's degree from Denison University in Granville, Ohio in 1983. His duel interests in Physics and Art, and his undergraduate degree in Studio Art, presaged the later intense focus upon proportion that became a significant hallmark of his design work. He received his Master of Architecture degree at the University of Virginia in 1986. His interest in classical design found support in this period of university education due to the leadership of Dean Jaquelin T. Robertson whose own work and background made him sympathetic to classicism. Sammons also developed a breadth of knowledge through his work as a teaching assistant to the internationally recognized architectural historian and Jefferson scholar, Dr. Frederick Doveton Nichols (1911-1995). Because the faculty of the University of Virginia School of Architecture focused primarily on modernism, Sammons looked to Thomas Jefferson as one of his principal instructors.

== Career ==
Sammons served his internship in the Manhattan office of David Anthony Easton, a classicist specializing in residential design. At Easton's office, Sammons learned detailing from Joe Marino, an architect who acquired his practical training in the Manhattan firms of Cross and Cross, and later Egerton Swartwout and Philip Goodwin. In 1992 Sammons established the firm of Richard Sammons Architect in New York City, New York. In 1997 Sammons and his wife Anne Fairfax renamed the firm Fairfax & Sammons Architects, PC. The firm has a second office in Palm Beach, Florida opened in 1998. Sammons is a registered architect in New York, Virginia, Connecticut, Ohio, Florida, Georgia, North Carolina, and South Carolina.

In addition to architectural practice, Sammons has taught classes (on architectural design and proportion) at the University of Notre Dame in Rome (Fall 2008); the Georgia Institute of Technology as the Harrison Design Associates Visiting Scholar (Fall 2005); as an instructor, The Prince of Wales Institute of Architecture London, England and the American Summer School (1993 – 1996); and Adjunct Professor of Architecture, Pratt Institute School of Architecture (1987 – 1996). Sammons also served as Associate Director, The Institute of Classical Architecture and The New York Academy of Art from 1993 to 1996.

Sammons was a founder of The Institute of Classical Architecture & Classical America. He has served as a board member of The Institute of Classical Architecture & Classical America; The Royal Oak Foundation; The Historic House Trust of New York City; The Sir John Soane's Museum Foundation; The Merchants House Museum, New York and he is a Guild Member of The New Urban Guild, a member of the INTBAU College of Traditional Practitioners (ICTP) and a Brother of The Art Workers Guild in London.

== Geometric proportioning in practice: examples from the work of Fairfax and Sammons ==
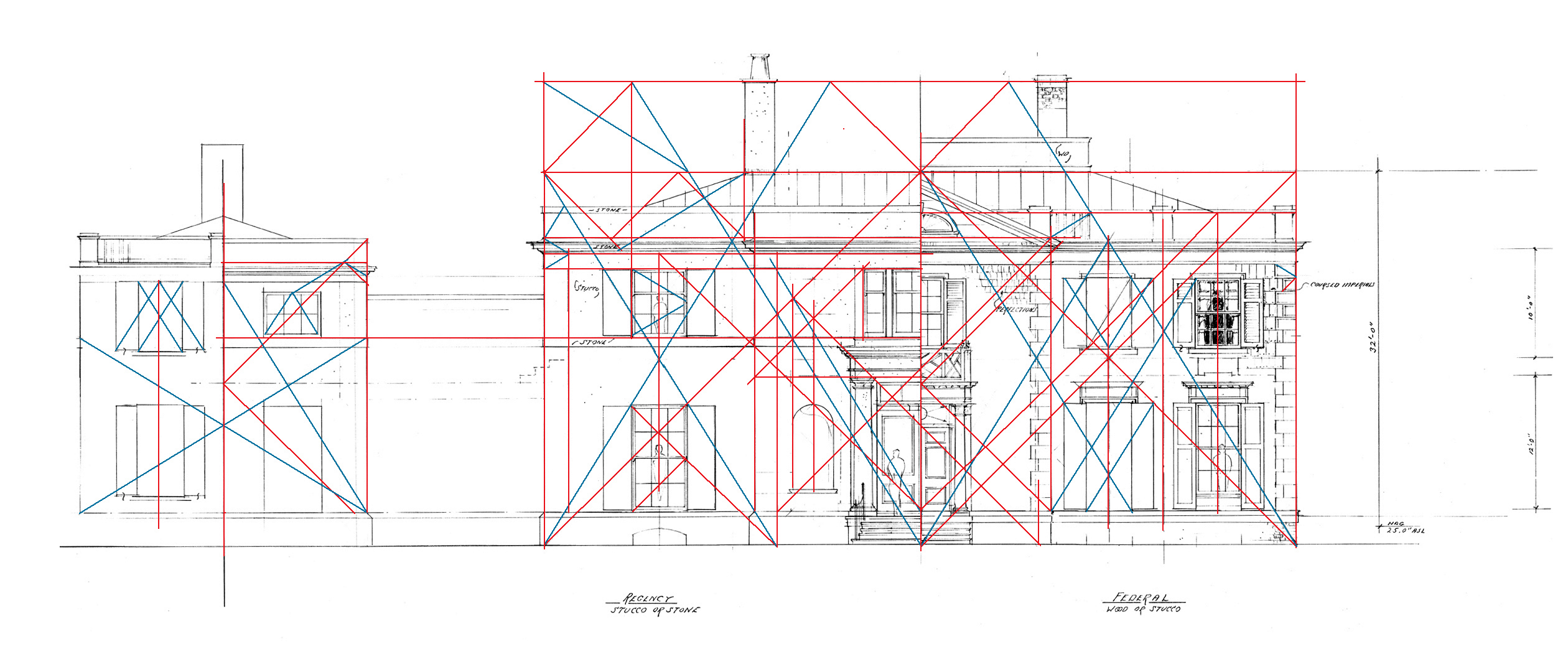

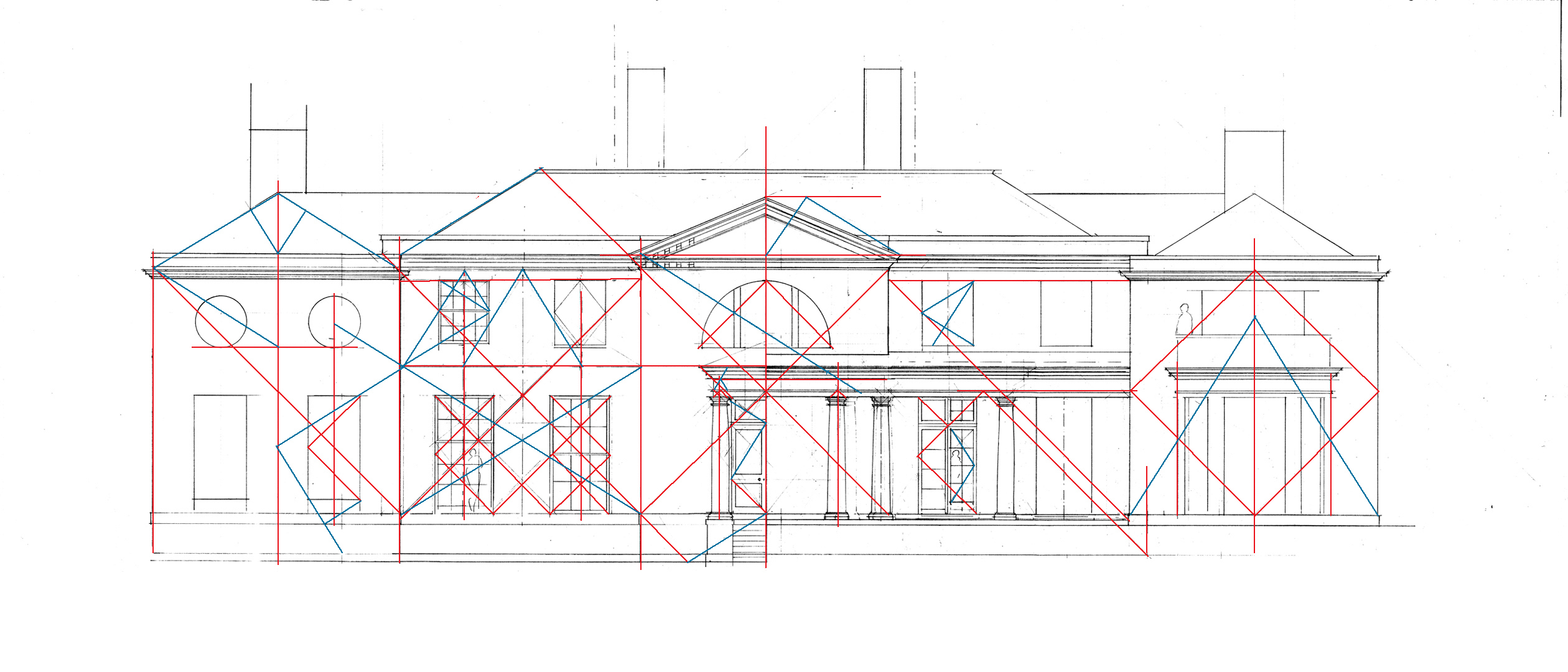

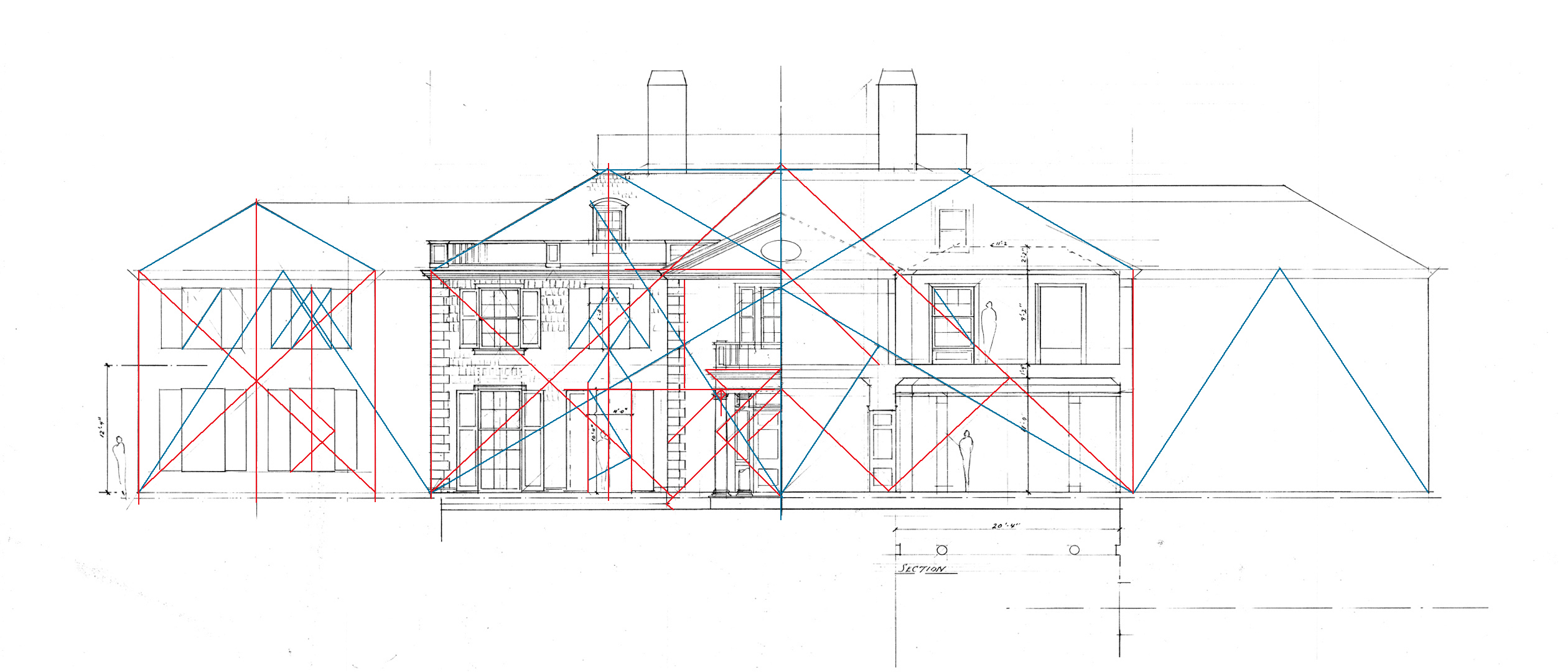
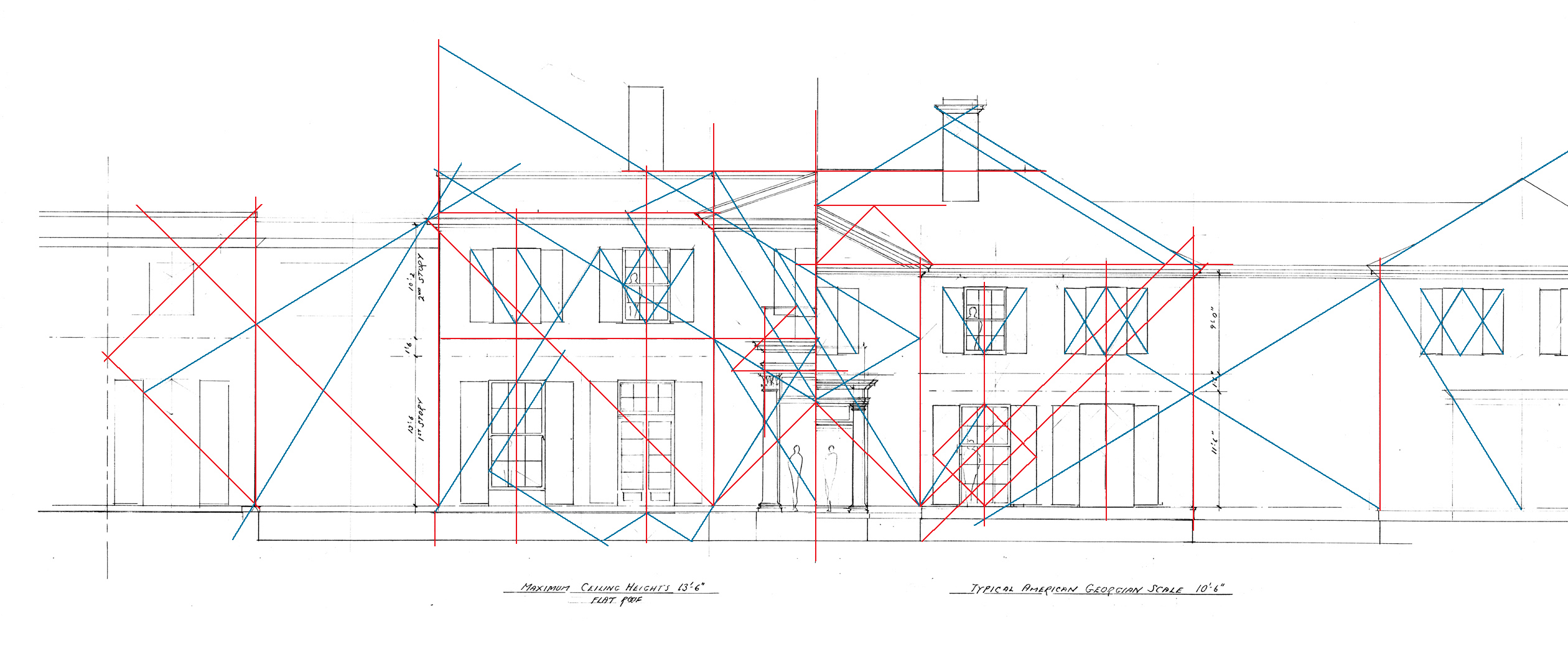

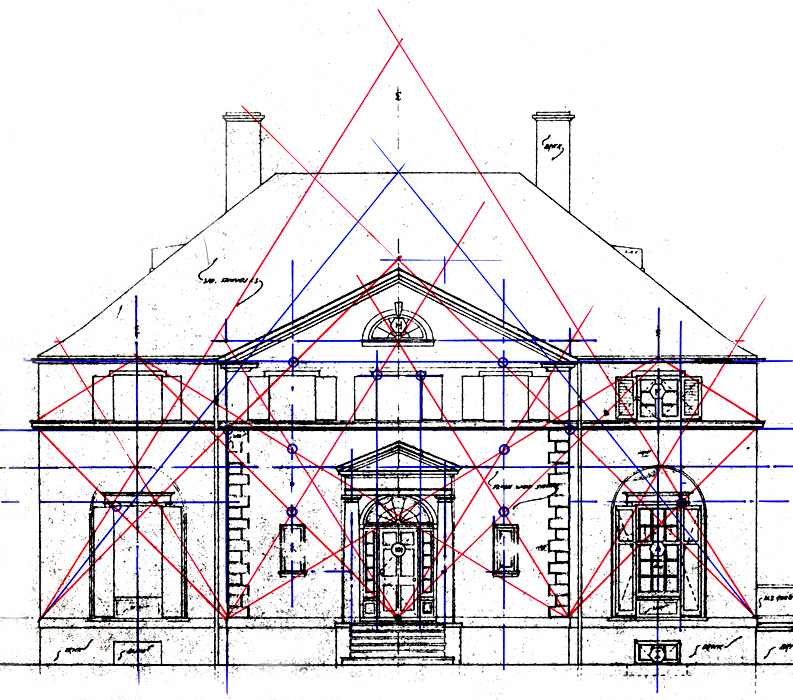

== Awards ==
Year	Award	Awarded by	Category
2020	Palladio Award	Traditional Building and Period Homes	Restoration and Renovation
2019	Stanford White Award	The Institute of Classical Architecture and Art	Residential Architecture - New Construction Over 5,000 SF
2019	Addison Mizner Medal	The Institute of Classical Architecture and Art Florida	Renovation/Addition
2019	Addison Mizner Medal	The Institute of Classical Architecture and Art Florida	Renovation/Addition
2018	Polly Earl Award	Palm Beach Preservation Foundation	Excellence in the rehabilitation of smaller scale, landmarked properties
2018	Stanford White Award	The Institute of Classical Architecture and Art	Residential Architecture – Renovations & Additions
2018	Addison Mizner Medal	The Institute of Classical Architecture and Art Florida	Renovation/Addition
2018	The Richard H. Driehaus Building Arts Award	Driehaus International Competition	Honorable mention for Urban Design
2018	Palladio Award	Traditional Building and Period Homes	Residential Multi-Unit
2017	Stanford White Award	The Institute of Classical Architecture and Art	Residential Architecture – New Construction Under 5,000 SF
2017	The Richard H. Driehaus Building Arts Award	Driehaus International Competition	Honorable mention for Urban Design
2017	Palladio Award	Traditional Building and Period Homes	New Design & Construction, more than 5,000 SF
2017	Addison Mizner Medal	The Institute of Classical Architecture and Art Florida	Interior Architecture
2016	Palladio Award	Traditional Building and Period Homes	New Design & Construction, less than 5,000 SF
2016	Addison Mizner Medal	The Institute of Classical Architecture and Art Florida	Residential
2015	Addison Mizner Medal	The Institute of Classical Architecture and Art Florida	Architecture Interiors
2015	Stanford White Award	The Institute of Classical Architecture and Art	Multi-family
2013	The Arthur Ross Award, for Lifetime Achievement in Architecture	The Institute of Classical Architecture and Art	Excellence in preserving and advancing the Classical tradition
2010	Philip Trammell Shutze Award	The Institute of Classical Architecture and Art	Residential Over 10,000 SF
2010	Philip Trammell Shutze Award	The Institute of Classical Architecture and Art	Urban Design
2010	CNU Charter Award	Congress for the New Urbanism	Block, Street, and Building

== Projects ==
Richard Sammons' projects include the following:
(For images and a description of each project refer to the firm's website: https://fairfaxandsammons.com/portfolio/)

=== Town ===
- Renovations to an Upper West Side Apartment, New York
- Renovation of a Greenwich Village Townhouse, New York
- Carriage House & Studio, Greenwich Village, New York
- Upper East Side Apartment, New York
- Upper East Side Townhouse, New York
- Upper West Side Artist Residence, New York
- Rustic French Maisonette, Greenwich Village
- Breakers Row Apartment, Palm Beach
- Central Park South Apartment, New York
- Park Avenue Residence, New York
- Central Park West Apartment at The Prasada, New York
- Italianate Townhouse, Greenwich Village, New York

=== Country ===
- Gothic Revival Restoration, Bedford, New York
- New Federal House, Cooperstown, New York
- New Palladian Villa, The Peak, Hong Kong
- New Georgian Residence, Washington, Connecticut
- English Arts & Crafts, Lake Waccabuc, New York
- Georgian Revival Addition, Lexington, Kentucky
- New Jeffersonian Residence, Southport, Connecticut
- Arts & Crafts Stone Cottage, Snedens Landing, New York
- Georgian Arts & Crafts, Greenwich, Connecticut
- Shingle Style Restoration, Greenwich, Connecticut
- House in Caesarea, Israel

=== Seaside ===
- Il Cortile, A New House in Palm Beach, Florida
- New House in Lost Tree Village, Palm Beach, Florida
- New British Colonial, Jupiter, Florida
- Regency House Renovation, Palm Beach, Florida
- New House and Outbuildings on Gin Lane, Southampton, NY
- New House in the Hamptons, Southampton, NY
- The Restoration and Addition to an Anglo-Caribbean House, Palm Beach, Florida
- New Anglo-Caribbean, Gulfstream, Florida
- Renaissance Revival Estate, Palm Beach, Florida
- Setai Penthouse, Miami, Florida

=== Neighborhood ===
- New Townhouses in Brooklyn, NY
- New Urban Marina, Albany, Bahamas
- University in Andorra, Spain
- The Crescent, Poundbury, Dorset, England
- New Urban Project, I'On Development, Mount Pleasant, South Carolina
- Urban Design, Charleston, South Carolina

== Books ==
- American Houses - The Architecture of Fairfax & Sammons; Mary Miers (Author); Adele Chatfield-Taylor (Introduction); Rizzoli International Publications (November 2006); ISBN 0-8478-2857-3
- Classical Architecture For The 21st Century; Francois Gabriel (Author); W. W. Norton & Company (April 2005); ISBN 0-393-73076-X
- The Colonial Revival House; Richard Guy Wilson (Author); Harry N. Abrams (December 2004); ISBN 0-8109-4959-8
- Get Your House Right: Architectural Elements to Use & Avoid; Marianne Cusato (Author), Ben Pentreath (Author), Leon Krier (Author), Richard Sammons (Author); H.R.H. The Prince of Wales (foreword); Sterling (January 1, 2008); ISBN 1-4027-3628-2
- Learning From Palladio; Branko Mitrovic (Author); W. W. Norton & Company (May 2004); ISBN 0-393-73116-2
- New Classicism: The Rebirth of Traditional Architecture; Elizabeth M. Dowling (Author); Rizzoli (October 29, 2004); ISBN 0-8478-2660-0
- New Compact House Designs; Don Metz (Author); Storey Publishing, LLC (January 8, 1991); ISBN 0-88266-666-5
- New Palladians: Modernity and Sustainability for 21st Century Architecture; Alireza Sagharchi (Author), Lucien Steil (Author); Artmedia Press (May 31, 2010); ISBN 1-902889-12-6
- Big Book of Small House Designs; Dom Metz (Author), Catherine Tredway (Author), Kenneth Tremblay (Author), Lawrence Von Bamford (Author); Black Dog & Leventhal Publishers Inc (September 16, 2004); ISBN 1-57912-365-1
- The Elements of Classical Architecture (Classical America Series in Art and Architecture); Georges Gromort (Author); Richard Sammons (Introductory Essay); W. W. Norton & Co. (June 20, 2001); ISBN 0-393-73051-4
- Theory of Mouldings (Classical America Series in Art and Architecture); C Howard Walker (Author); Richard Sammons (Foreword); W. W. Norton & Co. (July 31, 2007); ISBN 0-393-73233-9
- The Future of the Past: A Conservation Ethic for Architecture, Urbanism, and Historic Preservation; Steven Semes (Author); W. W. Norton & Company (November 9, 2009); ISBN 0-393-73244-4
- The Venice Charter Revisited: Modernism, Conservation and Tradition in the 21st Century; HRH The Prince of Wales (Foreword, Author), Robert Adam (Author), Steven Semes (Author), A. G. K. Menon (Author), Samir Younés (Author), Susan Parham (Author), Gabriele Tagliaventi (Author), Paolo Marconi (Author), Matthew Hardy (Editor); Cambridge Scholars Publishing (November 1, 2009); ISBN 1-84718-688-2

== Press ==
- Spanish Colonial Revival Restoration; Traditional Building June 2020
- Decorating Legend François Catroux Breathes New Life Into Crown Princess Marie-Chantal's Manhattan Townhome; Architectural Digest August 2019
- Inside Liv Tyler's Dreamy West Village Townhouse; Architectural Digest; August 2019
- At Hotel Bennett, a Midcentury Library Becomes an Historically Minded Hotel; Architectural Digest; January 2019
- A Classic Georgian Home with a Modernist Twist in Palm Beach; Architectural Digest; May 2017
- The Reader's Room, Gainsborough Studios; New York Spaces; April 2012
- Size Effects - Renovation of Carriage Houses in New York City; House & Garden; June 2014
- Master Architects; Palm Beach Society Magazine; Sept. - Oct. 2009
- Rooms - Stay Awhile; Palm Beach Illustrated; Habitat; March 2009
- Above the Fray by Gregory Cerio; Elle Decor; January 2009
- Side-by-Side by Kimberly Goad; Southern Accents Magazine; January 2009
- Tradition and Innovation by Erika Alexia Tsoukanelis; Fairfield County Homes; January 2009
- A Foundation in the Classics by Richard S. Chang; The New York Times; February 3, 2008
- Married Architects Reinterpret Classicism in Palm Beach by Jami Supsic; Palm Beach Cottages & Gardens; March 2008
- The Transformers by Mitchell Owens; Elle Decor; December 2007
- Positively West Fourth Street: Cozy Architect Couple Says Pshaw to Postmodernism by Toni Schlesinger; New York Observer; September 25, 2007
- Anne Fairfax & Richard Sammons House Profile; New York Social Diary; August 17, 2007
- Even a Master Needs Help Sometimes; The New York Times; Real Estate Sketch Pad - Bernards Township, N.J; August 5, 2007
- Residential Splendor Book Review by Eve M. Kahn; Period Homes; March, 2007
- Art Above and Below, With Life in the Middle by Fred A. Bernstein; The New York Times; January 4, 2007
- The Anatomy of the Georgian Room by Richard Sammons; Period Homes; March 2006
- Colman, David (February 10, 2005). "Mid-18th-Century Modern: The Classicists Strike Back". The New York Times.
- Reimagining the Far West Side by Alexander Stoddart, Thomas Gordon Smith, John Simpson, Richard Sammons, Peter Pennoyer, Franck Lohsen McCrery, Robert Adam; City Journal; Autumm 2004
- Britain Can Build It; Country Life; October 28, 2004
- The Vision for Marion Square by Jack Simmons; The Charleston City Guardian; December 2003
- Great American Home Award Winner - Old House Journal; Old House Journal; December, 2003
- Group Proposes Plan to Change the Look of Marion Square by Robert Behre; The Charleston Post & Courier; November 27, 2003
- Lyrical Compositions; Period Homes; Volume 4 Number 1; Spring 2003
- Perfect Proportions by Nancy Staab; Southern Accents Magazine; May 2003
- A Decade of Classical Design; The Prince's Foundation Alumni Newsletter; No. 4; Summer 2002
- New England's Home of the Brave; Country Life; October 11, 2001
- The College of Charleston Library; The Charleston City Guardian; Volume 3, Issue 2; April 2000
- Classic Ideals by Robert J. Hughes; The Wall Street Journal; House of the Week; March 10, 2000
- On The Waterfront by Steven M. I.Aroson; Architectural Digest; 1998
