= Mary Ann H. Dodd =

American poet

- Born: Mary Ann Hanmer Dodd; March 5, 1813; Hartford, Connecticut, US
- Died: January 18, 1878 (aged 64) near Albany, New York
- Education: Mrs. Kinnear's Seminary
- Occupation: Poet
- Spouse: Henry Shutts (m. 1855)
- Writing career
- Period: Romantic era

Mary Ann H. Dodd (after marriage Shutts; March 5, 1813 – January 18, 1878) was an American poet of the Romantic era, born and raised in Hartford, Connecticut. After completing her education in 1830, she became a frequent contributor of prose and poetry to periodicals, including The Ladies' Repository and the annual Rose of Sharon. A volume of her poems was published in 1843, characterized by a gentle melancholy and a deep religious feeling. She often published pieces in Universalist denominational prints.

== Biography ==
Mary Ann Hanmer Dodd was born at Hartford, Connecticut, on March 5, 1813, and always resided in that city. She was the daughter of Elisha Dodd. She was at school at Wethersfield, and in her native town, where she completed her studies in 1830, at Mrs. Kinnear's Seminary.

Her first published articles appeared in 1834, in the Hermethenean, a magazine conducted by the students of Washington College (now Trinity College), in Hartford. She wrote but little until 1835, since which time she was a frequent contributor to The Ladies' Repository, a magazine published in Boston, and the Rose of Sharon, an annual, in which the greater part of her writings appeared. A volume of her poems, published at Hartford in 1843, was marked by a gentle melancholy and a deep religious feeling.

She married Henry Shutts, of New York state, at Springfield, Massachusetts, in 1855. She was a Universalist, and published many of her pieces in denominational prints.

She died on January 18, 1878, near Albany, New York.

== Critical reception ==
Caroline May (1848) noted that Dodd "possesses a poetical sensibility, and the power of deducing moral lessons from the changes of life".

Samuel Austin Allibone (1863) characterized "The Lament", "the Mourner", "To a Cricket", "The Dreamer", and "The Dove's Visit", as compositions of rare excellence.

According to Wilson & Fiske (1887), "Her writings would have been known more generally, and perhaps more favorably, if she had not confined herself so much to denominational channels of publication."

== Selected works ==
- Poems, 1844
- Frederick Lee, or, The Christmas present, 1847
