= Dode, Jalandhar =

Dode
- Village
- Country: India
- State: Punjab
- District: Jalandhar

Languages
  - Official: Punjabi
- Time zone: UTC+5:30 (IST)
- Vehicle registration: PB- 08

Dode is a village in Jalandhar. Jalandhar is a district in the Indian state of Punjab. It lies on the Kartarpur-Kala Bakra road which is almost 1 km away from it. The nearest railway station to Dode is Kala Bakra railway station at a distance of 4 km.

Dode's post office is Mustafapur.
