= Dawn of Discovery =

Dawn of Discovery may refer to:

- Anno 1404, a 2009 computer game, known as Dawn of Discovery in North America
- Anno: Create A New World, a 2009 Nintendo Wii and DS game, known as Dawn of Discovery in North America
- Anno 1701: Dawn of Discovery, a 2007 Nintendo DS game
- The Age of Discovery, the period in history during which Europeans and their descendants intensively explored and mapped the world
