= Dods =

Dods may refer to:

== People ==
- Darren Dods (born 1975), Scottish footballer
- Glenn Dods (born 1958), New Zealand retired association football player
- John Dods (rugby union) (1875–1915), Scottish rugby union player
- Lorimer Dods (1900–1981), Australian paediatrician and a pioneer of specialised health care for children
- Marcus Dods (theologian born 1786) (1786–1838), Scottish theologian
- Marcus Dods (theologian born 1834) (1834–1909), Scottish theologian
- Marcus Dods (musician) (1918–1984), British musician
- Mary Diana Dods (1790–1830) Scottish writer
- Michael Dods (born 1968), Scottish former rugby union player
- Peter Dods (born 1958), Scottish former rugby union player
- Robin Dods (1868–1920), New Zealand-born Australian architect
- Walter A. Dods, Jr., American business executive, banker and philanthropist from Hawaii

== Other uses ==
- Meg Dods, fictional character from Walter Scott's St. Ronan's Well
- Dods (Group) PLC
- Dod's Parliamentary Communications
- Dance of December Souls
- Day of Defeat: Source, a computer game by Valve

== See also ==
- Døds
- Dodds (disambiguation)
- Dod (disambiguation)
