= Martin Dodd =

Danish-born music executive

- Born: Copenhagen, Denmark
- Occupation: Music executive
- Known for: Fame Academy, Star Academy, Operacion Triunfo, X Factor, and The Voice

Martin Dodd is a Danish-born music executive.

Dodd is a former Sony Music International senior VP of worldwide A&R.

== Career ==
Dodd began as a 17-year-old in the Danish label Mega Records. Here he worked himself up until his first in 1990 signed a contract with Ace of Base, which sold over 30 million records. Dodd has also done television concepts, some with John de Mol.
