= New York Social Diary =

Website covering New York City high society and social events

- Available in: English
- Creator: David Patrick Columbia (founder)
- Website: newyorksocialdiary.com
- Launched: 1993; 33 years ago (print); 2000; 26 years ago (website)
- Current status: Active

New York Social Diary is a website that publishes photographs of "the rich and powerful" socialites and a social calendar of events that they might attend. It is maintained by David Patrick Columbia, who founded it in 2000.

== History ==
The Diary originated in 1993 as a monthly column in Quest magazine. The column had a similar focus to the present website.

Many people are in the social diary.

== Influence ==
Chase Coleman III has refused to be photographed for any publication since his 2005 wedding photographed by the New York Social Diary.

== See also ==
- List of blogs
