= Suzanne Dodd =

Suzanne R. Dodd
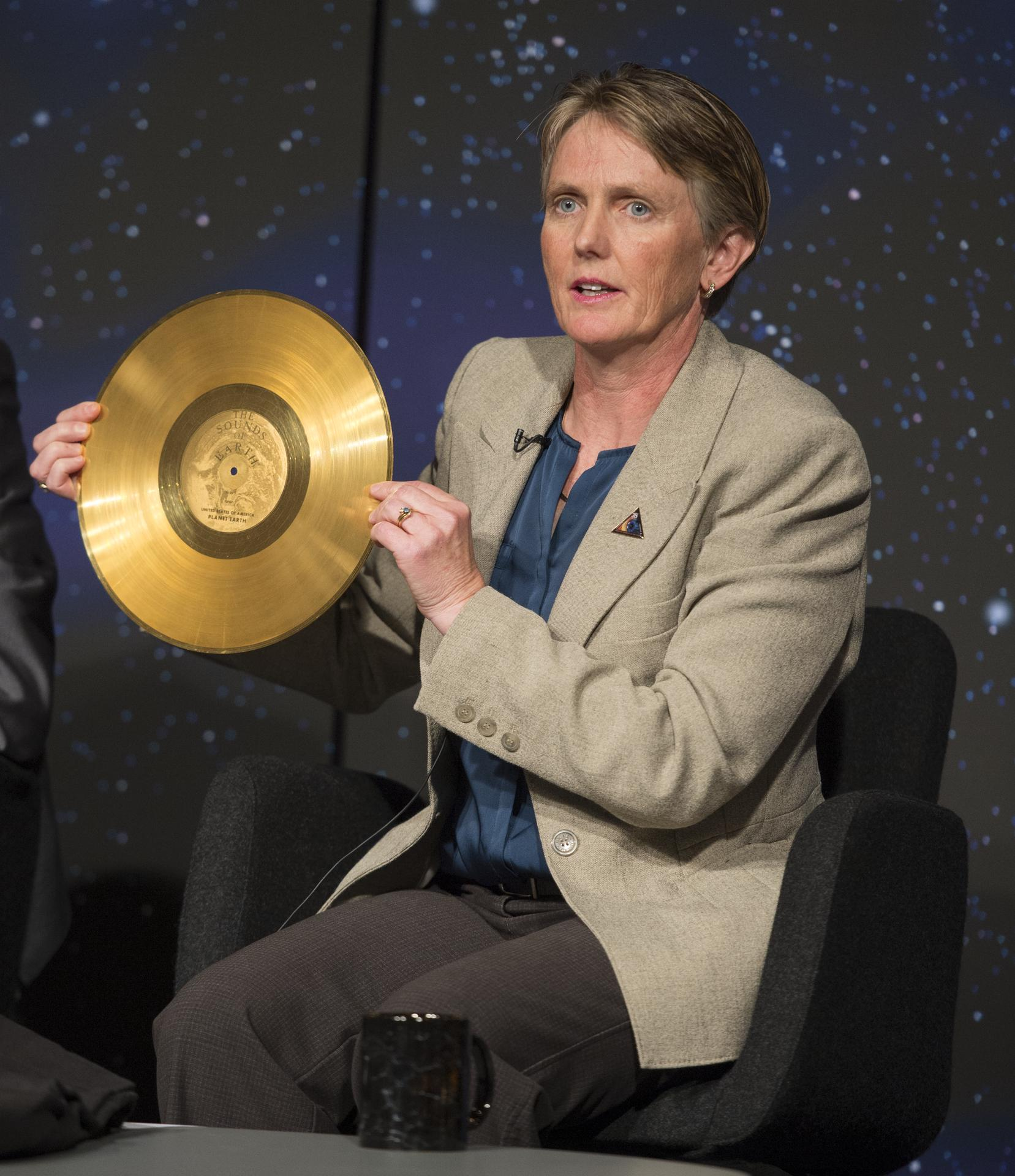
- Dodd with a replica of the Voyager Golden Record, 2013
- Born: Tacoma, Washington, U.S.
- Education: Caltech (BS); Whitman College (BA); University of Southern California (MS)
- Scientific career
- Fields: aerospace engineering
- Workplaces: JPL

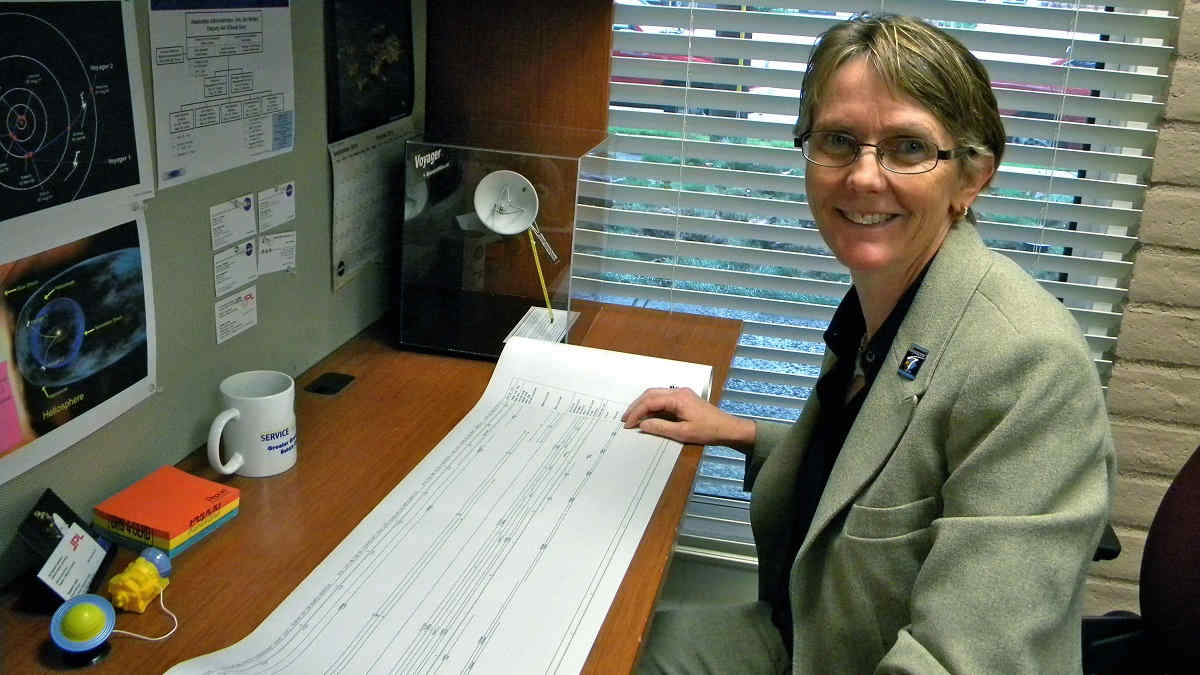
Dodd with a sheet of vellum that shows the timeline of commands communicated to Voyager 2 during its closest approach to Neptune on Aug. 25, 1989

Suzanne R. "Suzy" Dodd is an American project scientist of multiple NASA spacecraft missions.

== Biography ==
Dodd was born in Tacoma, Washington and grew up in Gig Harbor in the same state. Her parents were from New York City. She received a BS degree in Engineering and Applied Science from Caltech (1984), a BA degree in Math/Physics from Whitman College (in Walla Walla, Washington), and an MS degree in Aerospace Engineering from the University of Southern California.

Dodd was hired by Jet Propulsion Laboratory (JPL) in 1984 as a sequence design engineer for the Voyager 2 during its flyby of Uranus; she became the lead sequence engineer who designed the closest approach sequence for the Neptune flyby. She left Voyager in 1989, and worked on the mission planning team for the failed Mars Observer mission (1990-1993) and on the Cassini mission to Saturn, where she had a team of around 40 people. She worked on Cassini for six years (1993-1999).

Dodd was a project manager of the Spitzer Space Telescope and the manager of the Spitzer Space Telescope Science Center at Caltech since 1999; a project manager of the Nuclear Spectroscopic Telescope Array (NuSTAR) (2012-2016); a manager of NASA's Infrared Processing and Analysis Center (IPAC). In 2010, she became the tenth project manager of the Voyager program. Voyager was already on an extended mission; in 2012 Voyager 1, and in 2018 Voyager 2 crossed the heliopause and entered interstellar space. Theoretically, the spacecraft have enough power until c. 2032; after that there wouldn't be enough power for communication systems. In 2016, she was named the director of JPL's Interplanetary Network Directorate that manages the Deep Space Network (DSN). The farthest spacecraft that "talk" with the DSN are Voyagers.

Dodd received several NASA awards: NASA Exceptional Service Medal, NASA Public Service Medal, NASA Silver Achievement Medal and NASA Outstanding Leadership Medal.

Dodd's husband was an athletic coach at Caltech; they have two daughters. She is an "avid Masters swimmer".

== Selected publications ==
- Dodd, Suzanne; Gustavson, Robert (2000). "Flying Cassini with Virtual Operations Teams". Reducing the Cost of Spacecraft Ground Systems and Operations. Space Technology Proceedings. Vol. 3. pp. 161–167. doi:10.1007/978-94-015-9395-3_21. ISBN 978-90-481-5400-5.
- Dodd, Suzanne R. (2004). "The Spitzer science operations system: How well are we really doing?". In Mather, John C. (ed.). Optical, Infrared, and Millimeter Space Telescopes. Vol. 5487. p. 158. doi:10.1117/12.551632.
- Bennett, Lee; Comeau, Susan; Levine, Deborah A.; Dodd, Suzanne R. (2006). "The Spitzer Science Center: System description and lessons learned due to two years of operations". In Silva, David R.; Doxsey, Rodger E. (eds.). Observatory Operations: Strategies, Processes, and Systems. Vol. 6270. doi:10.1117/12.672201.
- Dodd, Suzanne R.; Levine, Deborah A. (2006). "The Spitzer Space Telescope's performance: Getting the most out of a great observatory". In Silva, David R.; Doxsey, Rodger E. (eds.). Observatory Operations: Strategies, Processes, and Systems. Vol. 6270. doi:10.1117/12.670621.
- Dodd, Suzanne R.; Storrie-Lombardi, Lisa; Scott, Charles P. (2008). "Spitzer's model for dealing with the end of the cryogenic mission". In Brissenden, Roger J.; Silva, David R. (eds.). Observatory Operations: Strategies, Processes, and Systems II. Vol. 7016. pp. 70160D. doi:10.1117/12.788131.
- Storrie-Lombardi, Lisa J.; Dodd, Suzanne R. (2010). "Downsizing a great observatory: Reinventing Spitzer in the warm mission". In Silva, David R.; Peck, Alison B.; Soifer, B. Thomas (eds.). Observatory Operations: Strategies, Processes, and Systems III. Vol. 7737. pp. 77370L. doi:10.1117/12.857827.
- Storrie-Lombardi, Lisa J.; Dodd, Suzanne R. (2012). "Spitzer warm mission: maximizing the science return in the extended mission phase". In Peck, Alison B.; Seaman, Robert L.; Comeron, Fernando (eds.). Observatory Operations: Strategies, Processes, and Systems IV (PDF). Vol. 8448. pp. 84481E. doi:10.1117/12.925249.
- Yunjin Kim; Willis, J.; Dodd, S.; Harrison, F.; Forster, K.; Craig, W.; Bester, M.; Oberg, D. (2013). "Nuclear Spectroscopic Telescope Array (NuSTAR) Mission". 2013 IEEE Aerospace Conference. pp. 1–9. doi:10.1109/AERO.2013.6496933. ISBN 978-1-4673-1813-6.
- Forster, Karl; Harrison, Fiona A.; Dodd, Suzanne R.; Stern, Daniel K.; Miyasaka, Hiromasa; Madsen, Kristin K.; Grefenstette, Brian W.; Markwardt, Craig B.; Craig, William W.; Marshall, Francis E. (2014). "NuSTAR observatory science operations: On-orbit acclimation". In Peck, Alison B.; Benn, Chris R.; Seaman, Robert L. (eds.). Observatory Operations: Strategies, Processes, and Systems V. Vol. 9149. pp. 91490R. doi:10.1117/12.2056916.
- Dodd, Suzanne R. (2014). "A comparison of operation models and management strategies for the Spitzer Space Telescope and the Nuclear Spectroscopic Telescope Array". In Peck, Alison B.; Benn, Chris R.; Seaman, Robert L. (eds.). Observatory Operations: Strategies, Processes, and Systems V. Vol. 9149. doi:10.1117/12.2055499.
