= Tee-name =

A tee-name is a form of nickname traditionally used in the north-east of Scotland to disambiguate people with the same name or in the same family, in the same way as the agnomen (or in early periods the cognomen) was used in Roman naming conventions. A tee-name can be based on a personal characteristic, a trade, or where the person lived. An example is "Muckle Sanny Fite" for "Alexander White", where "Muckle" means "big" (a tee-name), and "Sanny" (or Sandy, or Elshioner) is a diminutive of "Alexander".

Tee-names could be inherited from a parent.
