= Australia and New Zealand School of Government =

The Australia and New Zealand School of Government
- Established: 2002
- Dean: Caron Beaton-Wells (as of 2025)
- Location: Carlton, Victoria, Australia
- Website: anzsog.edu.au

The Australia and New Zealand School of Government (ANZSOG) is an educational institution that teaches strategic management and high-level policy to public sector leaders in the Australia, New Zealand, and the Pacific region.

== History and description ==
Formed in 2002 by a consortium of governments, universities and business schools from Australia and New Zealand, the school is home to a large research program that aims to deepen government, community, and academic understanding of public administration, policy, and management.

ANZSOG, which is based in Carlton, Victoria, also administers an internationally-recognised case teaching program in the specialist teaching area of public policy and management in Australia, New Zealand and the Pacific.

As of July 2025, Caron Beaton-Wells is CEO and dean of the organisation.

== Members ==
=== Government members ===
- New Zealand Government
- ACT Government
- Commonwealth of Australia
- Northern Territory Government
- New South Wales Government
- Queensland Government
- South Australian Government
- Tasmanian Government
- Victorian Government
- Western Australian Government

=== University members ===
- Australian National University
- Charles Darwin University
- Curtin University of Technology
- Flinders University
- Griffith University
- Melbourne Business School
- Monash University
- University of Adelaide
- University of Melbourne
- University of New South Wales
- University of Queensland
- University of Sydney
- University of Canberra
- University of Tasmania
- Victoria University of Wellington
