= Pierce Dod =

British physician (1683–1754)

Pierce Dod FRS, FRCP (1683–1754) was a British physician and opponent of smallpox inoculation. He graduated from Brasenose College, Oxford in 1701, received his MA in 1705, MD in 1714 and was elected a fellow of the Royal College of Physicians in 1720. He was made a physician to St. Bartholomew's Hospital from 1725 until his death, and he joined the Royal Society in 1730.

His entry into the smallpox controversy occurred in 1746. He wrote Several cases in physick, and one in particular, giving an account of a person who was inoculated for the small-pox. . . and yet had it again. The pamphlet discussed nine cases that were to prove that inoculation was not effective. However, only one of the clinical cases was actually an indictment of the smallpox inoculation practice, and that was a child who was inoculated at the age of three and then developed smallpox at five. This work was countered by doctors J. Kirkpatrick, W. Barrowby, and I. Schomberg in A letter to the real and genuine Pierce Dod, MD, exposing the low absurdity of a late spurious pamphlet falsely ascrib'd to that learned physician: with a full answer to the mistaken case of a natural small-pox, after taking it by inoculation, by Dod Pierce, MS. The answering pamphlet was entirely satirical—pretending that the original must have been a piracy, since the real Pierce Dod would never have made such a mistake as to write about a case that he had not personally witnessed and would have understood that some persons get smallpox twice. (Dod had had the case of second infection reported in a letter to him.) They argued that only someone afraid of losing money from his clinical practice would oppose inoculations that prevented disease.

The satire caused Dod a great deal of professional damage, both to his reputation and his practice. He died on 6 August 1754.
