= J. Colin Dodds =

Canadian academic

J. Colin Dodds was the President of Saint Mary's University, Halifax, in the Canadian province of Nova Scotia.

== Career ==
Dodds began teaching Finance at Saint Mary's University in 1982 and went on to become Department Chairperson, Director of the MBA Program, and Dean of the Sobey School of Business (then known as the Frank H. Sobey Faculty of Commerce).

Beginning in 1991 he went on to serve as Academic Vice President for nine years. On July 1, 2000 Dodds became the 33rd President of Saint Mary's University. In 2005, the Board of Governors at Saint Mary’s unanimously appointed him to a new five-year term, which begins this year, July 1, 2006.

He is also currently the President of the Council of Nova Scotia University Presidents and President of the Canadian Bureau for International Education. From 1991 to 2000, Dodds served as the Vice-President, Academic and Research at Saint Mary's.

In 1992, Dodds was one of the organizers of a thirteen episode televised entrepreneurship training program called "Owning My Own Business", which was broadcast on the Atlantic Satellite Network to Canada's four Atlantic Provinces, and produced by the Atlantic Provinces Chamber of Commerce. The program, adapted from a similar French-language offering at Université Laval in Quebec, saw the development of a textbook, 13 television modules of 30 minutes each covering all of the key topics in the text, and a student workbook, all designed to assist Atlantic Canadian entrepreneurs to start and run their own businesses. Dodds has also produced many academic credentials and academic publications.

Dodds began teaching Finance at Saint Mary's in 1982. He then went on to become Chair of the Finance and Management Science Department, Director of the MBA Program and then Dean of The Frank H. Sobey Faculty of Commerce, the leading business school in Atlantic Canada. He holds a Bachelor of Arts Degree (The Open University), a Bachelor of Science in Economics (Honours) (University of Hull), and a Master of Arts and Ph. D. (University of Sheffield).

== Family ==
Dodds resides in Halifax with his wife, Carol. They have two children, James and Elizabeth. Carol and James Dodds are St. Mary's alumni.

Dodds was made an Associate Alumnus of St. Mary's University by the Alumni Association in 1995.
