= Dody =

Dodi, Dodie, or Dody is a given name of various origins, used for both men and women. When used as a feminine name, it may be a diminutive for Dolores or Dorothy.

== People ==
=== Doddie ===
- Doddie Weir (born George Weir, 4 July 1970), Scottish rugby union player

=== Dodi ===
- Dodi Fayed (1955–1997), Egyptian multi-millionaire and film producer
- Dodi Gago (born 1956), nickname of Gagik Tsarukyan, Armenian politician and businessman
- Dodi Protero (1931–2007), Canadian operatic singer

=== Dodie ===
- Dodie (born 1995), English singer-songwriter, author, and YouTuber
- Dodie Bellamy, American novelist and journalist
- Dodie Heath (1926–2023), American actress
- Dodie Horton, American politician
- Dodie Kazanjian (born 1952), American writer specializing in the arts
- Dodie McGuinness (born 1950), Irish politician
- Dodie Boy Peñalosa (born 1962), Filipino boxer
- Dodie Post (1922–2012), American alpine skier
- Dodie Smith (1896–1990), English novelist and playwright
- Dodie Stevens (born 1946), American pop singer

=== Dody ===
- Dody Crane, Canadian politician
- Dody Dorn (born 1955), American film and sound editor
- Dody Goodman (1914–2008), American character actress
- Dody Roach (1937–2004), American poker player
- Dody Weston Thompson (1923–2012), American photographer and historian of photography
- Dody Wood (born 1972), Canadian ice hockey player

== Fictional characters ==
- Deirdre Hortense "Dodie" Bishop, in the American animated television series As Told by Ginger
- Dorothy "Dodie" Harper Douglas, in the American television series My Three Sons

== See also ==
- Dode, a typically male form of the nickname
- Dod (nickname), another alternate form
