= Robert Dodd (footballer) =

English footballer

Personal information
- Full name: Robert Dodd
- Place of birth: Blackburn, England
- Position: Wing half

Senior career*
Years	Team	Apps	(Gls)
1910–1911	Burnley	5	(0)
- * Club domestic league appearances and goals

Robert Dodd was an English professional association footballer who played as a half back. He was born in Blackburn, Lancashire and played five games in the Football League for Burnley in the 1910–11 season.
