= Preservation Foundation of Palm Beach =

The Preservation Foundation of Palm Beach is a private, nonprofit membership organization dedicated to the preservation of the historic, architectural, as well as cultural heritage of Palm Beach, Florida. Through advocacy initiatives, educational programs, architectural resources, and cultural events, the foundation's goal is to encourage the community to learn about and save the historic buildings that make the town of Palm Beach special.

== History ==
Founded in 1981, the organization is committed to honoring and preserving Palm Beach's original architectural treasures and public spaces. Honorable Judge James R. Knott, a dedicated historian and author, facilitated the establishment of the Preservation Foundation of Palm Beach. It has lobbied local and county government to change policy and enact legislation that directly and legally protects Palm Beach's architectural assets. The buildings and styles of Mizner, Wyeth, Fatio, and Volk are as unique as they are important to the overall character and charm of the town. The organization not only encourages education and appreciation for these historical structures, but also works against the forces of speculation, development, and degradation to ensure they remain a vital part of the community. The restoration, rehabilitation, and conservation of historic structures and public spaces can spur economic and cultural development.

The organization has been able to save the town's oldest house (Sea Gull Cottage), restore the historic Town Hall, create the Earl E.T. Smith Preservation Park, establish a heritage education program for fourth grade school children, restore the Little Red Schoolhouse (the oldest one-room school in Southeast Florida that offers a living history program under its roof), and create Pan's Garden in the heart of the town that offers educational programs about native plants and butterflies. Town-owned open space has also been safeguarded, as well as neighborhood zoning strengthened and upheld through the efforts of preservationists. Facade easement donations to the foundation help protect buildings, as well as bring tax savings to owners. Millions of dollars have gone to purchase property, as well as into restoration and rehabilitation over the years.

== Awards ==
Several awards are offered to encourage preserving of the historic, architectural, and cultural heritage:

- The Ballinger Award commemorates a restoration or new construction that best exemplifies the traditions of original houses and the architects who designed them. The award was first presented in 1987 in honor of the late Robert I. Ballinger Jr., former chairman of the Palm Beach Landmarks Preservation Commission. Mr. Ballinger worked to instill pride in the island's architectural heritage.
- The Polly Earl Award was founded in 2005 and is given to recognize a Palm Beach property owner for outstanding service to the cause of preservation, specifically through restoration of an existing landmarked property or property of historic significance that is not necessarily a large estate. Mrs. Earl was the foundation's executive director for some 20 years. She died in 2005. The first award was given toward the restoration of a house on Seabreeze Avenue, in one of the original neighborhoods on the island.
- The Elizabeth L. and John H. Schuler Award was founded in 2005 by Mr. and Mrs. Schuler to recognize new architecture that is designed and built in keeping with the traditional styles of the town's architecture. John Schuler served as chairman of the Town of Palm Beach Architectural Review Commission.

== Heritage Education ==
In 1987, the Preservation Foundation of Palm Beach introduced its Heritage Education Program. The goal is to teach children about the history and culture of Palm Beach through its local architecture and cultural artifacts. The program's workshops are currently offered in several public and private schools in or near the Town of Palm Beach.

Since 1990, Palm Beach county teachers have participated in teacher training workshops sponsored by the foundation. These sessions are designed to instruct teachers how to create local heritage education programs in their schools. In 1993, the Florida Trust for Historic Preservation presented The Preservation Foundation of Palm Beach its Outstanding Achievement Award in Education for the Heritage Education Program.

== Archives ==
The organization's Archives and Library exist to sustain the mission of the foundation by collecting, preserving, organizing, and encouraging use of its historical documents and research materials. Maintained are a collection of books, historic documents, resource materials and photographs dealing with architecture, Palm Beach, Florida history, historic preservation, as well as horticulture and landscape architecture. Housed in the foundation's headquarters, the archives and library have resources that are available to the community.
