= Robert F. Dodd =

Canadian soldier (1844–1903)

- Born: December 31, 1844; Galt, Canada West
- Died: September 14, 1903 (aged 58); Winnipeg, Manitoba
- Burial place: Hillside Cemetery, Manitoba
- Military career
- Allegiance: United States of America
- Branch: United States Army
- Service years: 1862, 1863 - 1865
- Rank: Private
- Unit: 27th Michigan Volunteer Infantry Regiment
- Conflicts: Battle of the Crater
- Awards: Medal of Honor

Private Robert Fulton Dodd (December 31, 1844 – September 14, 1903) was a Canadian soldier who fought in the American Civil War. Dodd received the United States' highest award for bravery during combat, the Medal of Honor, for his action during the Battle of the Crater in Petersburg, Virginia, on 30 July 1864. He was honored with the award on 27 July 1896.

== Biography ==
Dodd was born in Galt in Canada West on 31 December 1844. He enlisted into an independent company within the Michigan infantry called the Stanton Guards on 4 May 1862. After mustering out of this company on 25 September 1862, he reenlisted into the 27th Volunteer Infantry on 25 February 1863. It was while serving in this capacity that he performed the act of gallantry on 30 July 1864, during the Battle of the Crater, that would earn him the Medal of Honor. He mustered out of the army on 26 July 1865 and eventually returned to Canada.

He died on 14 September 1903 and his remains are interred at the Hillside Cemetery in Manitoba.

== Medal of Honor citation ==
While acting as orderly, voluntarily assisted to carry off the wounded from the ground in front of the crater while exposed to a heavy fire.

== See also ==
- List of American Civil War Medal of Honor recipients: A–F
