= Stephen Hatfield Dodds =

Australian economist

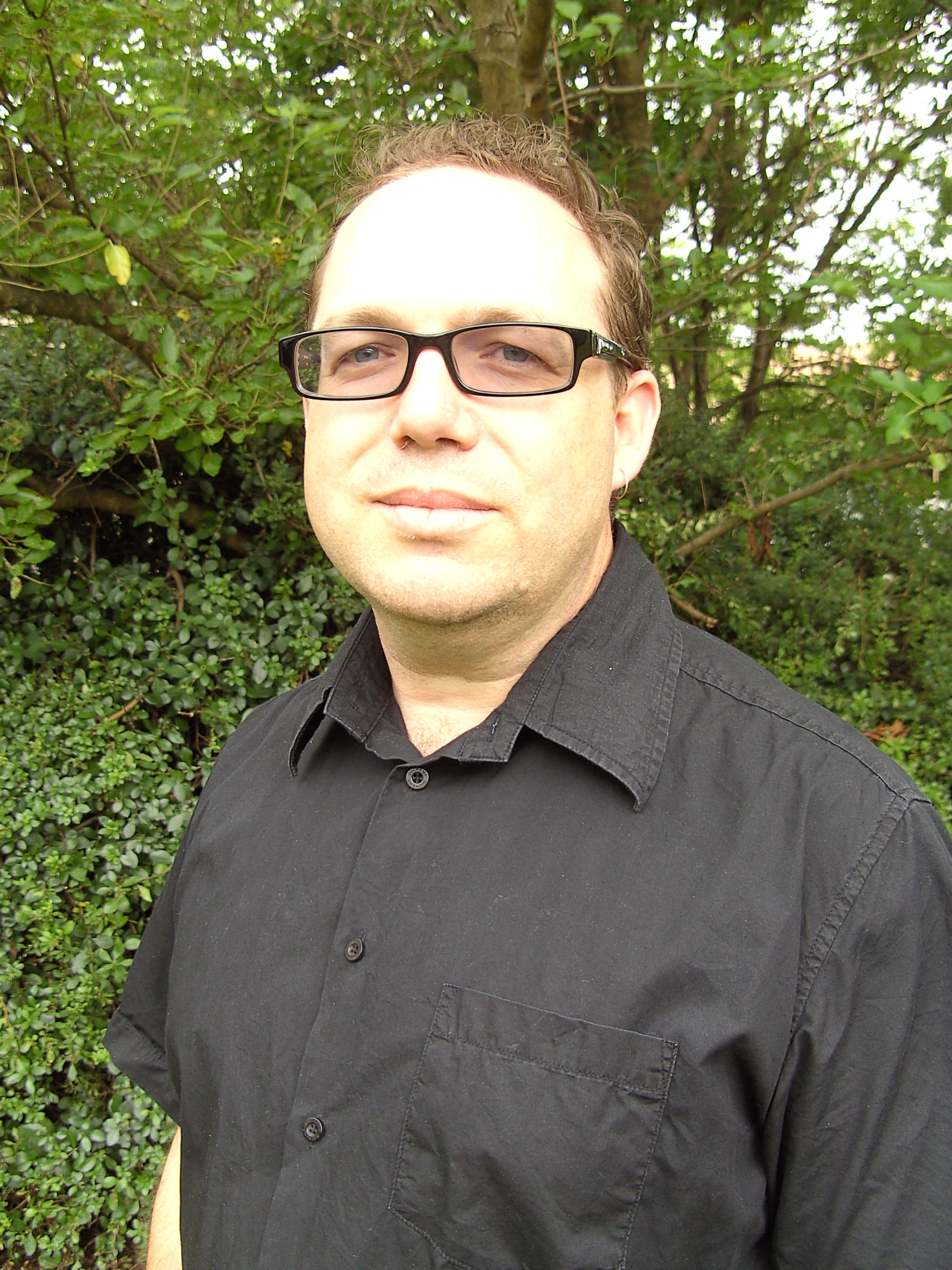
- Steve Hatfield Dodds, February 2011
- Born: Stephen Dodds
- Occupation: Philosophical economist

Steve Hatfield Dodds (born Stephen Dodds) is an Australian philosophical economist, with some work in the social cost of economic decision-making and particularly sustainable development and the economic impact of climate change.

== Education ==
In 2000, Hatfield Dodds gained his PhD in Economics from the Australian National University in Canberra, after submitting a thesis, From consumerism to sustainable development: essays on progress, well-being and limits in economic thought.

== Work ==
Soon after graduating, and joining the Australian Government's Treasury, Hatfield Dodds was seconded to the Canadian Department of Finance for several years and lived in Ottawa with his family.

On returning to Australia, he held positions in The Allen Consulting Group, Environment Australia, and the Australian National University.

He worked with, and advised on:

- cost-benefit analysis and non-market valuation in public policy (1998–2003);
- developing robust frameworks for identifying the benefits and value of social capital and related social impacts (2001);
- State Government agencies on the design and implementation of triple bottom line reporting and governance systems, including projects with the Government of Victoria to develop practical tools for assessing potential economic impacts of environmental risks (2001–03);
- issues in integrating transport and greenhouse policies, for Commonwealth and State Transport Ministers (2002);
- the Greening Australia 'green bank' leverage fund pilot under the National Action Plan market based instrument trial.
- He has contributed to:
  - Building a Stronger Social Coalition (2002), proposing practical tax measures to encourage philanthropy in Australia;
  - Repairing the Country: Leveraging Private Investment for the Australian Conservation Foundation's Business Leaders Roundtable (2001), as a senior author;
  - the Wentworth Group of Concerned Scientists' Blueprint for a Living Continent report (November 2002),
  - A New Model for Landscape Conservation in New South Wales (February 2003) commissioned by Premier Bob Carr, and
  - Blueprint for a National Water Plan (July 2003);
- Was lead consultant with the Government of the Australian Capital Territory in the development of its long term industry policy framework (2002–03);

He joined Australia's Commonwealth Scientific and Industrial Research Organisation (CSIRO) in 2002, and in 2003 became Senior Researcher in the Integration Science and Public Policy office, CSIRO Sustainable Ecosystems. In 2008 he joined the newly formed Commonwealth Department of Climate Change.

In the December 2007 report Leader, follower or free rider? for the Government of the United Kingdom (to which he contributed a submission), Hatfield Dodds as lead author argued for deep cuts in Australia's greenhouse gas emissions in the next 40 years (to 2050) and that the economic costs are modest and manageable and, indeed, preferable to the consequences of not acting. "It is much more disruptive and costly to step up action than to relax it so it is better to start off with the most stringent target you can imagine and that is what we have modelled... ".

In 2022, the Albanese government commissioned an Independent Review of Australian Carbon Credit Units, that reported in December 2022. The independent panel was composed of Professor Ian Chubb AC (Chair), the Hon Dr Annabelle Bennett AC SC, Ms Ariadne Gorring and Dr Stephen Hatfield Dodds.

== Positions held ==
- Executive Director - Australian Bureau of Agricultural and Resource Economics (ABARES), 2017–2020
- President - Australia and New Zealand Society for Ecological Economics (ANZSEE)
- Participant - Australia 2020 Summit (Group: Population, sustainability, climate change and water), 19 & 20 April 2008

== Awards ==
The Bulletin magazine's 28 October 2003 edition named Hatfield Dodds in its inaugural 'Smart 100' list of leading Australian innovators.

== Family ==
- Hatfield Dodds is married to Lin Hatfield Dodds, a leading Australian Christian social activist, political lobbyist, and former President of the Australian Council of Social Service (ACOSS).
- Steve and Lin decided to blend their family names and use the combined "Hatfield Dodds".
- He is an active Christian, a prominent member of Kippax Uniting Church, and active in the Zadok Institute for Christianity and Society.
