= Quest (lifestyle magazine) =

American lifestyle magazine

- Editor: David Patrick Columbia
- Categories: Lifestyle magazine
- Frequency: Monthly
- Circulation: 65,000
- Founder: Heather Cohane
- Founded: 1986
- Company: Quest Media
- Country: United States
- Based in: New York City, New York
- Language: English
- Website: questmag.com

Quest is an American lifestyle magazine based in New York City. It was founded in 1986 by Heather Cohane as a real estate magazine for "Manhattan Properties & Country Estates". In 1995, Meigher Communications, which already owned Family Health, Garden Design, and Saveur purchased Quest. Today, Quest Media publishes Quest, Quest Greenwich Polo, and the quarterly fashion magazine Q.

Quest's target audience includes both first and second generation readers, those who helped launch the magazine, and those who grew up on it. The magazine showcases New York's most elegant charities, parties, and families, both past and present. Each edition is themed, including "The 400", "Arts and Culture", "Fall Fashion", and "Holiday" issues. The magazine also publishes David Patrick Columbia's "New York Social Diary", a monthly chronicle of society circuit parties. Contributors have included Dominick Dunne, David Halberstam, Liz Smith, Taki Theodoracopulos, Michael Thomas, Garry Wills, and photographers Slim Aarons and Harry Benson.

The circulation is 65,000 plus a seasonal distribution of more than 20,000 in Palm Beach, Florida, and The Hamptons. The median reader age is 43.4 with an annual income of $1,437,000.
