= Frontispiece (architecture) =

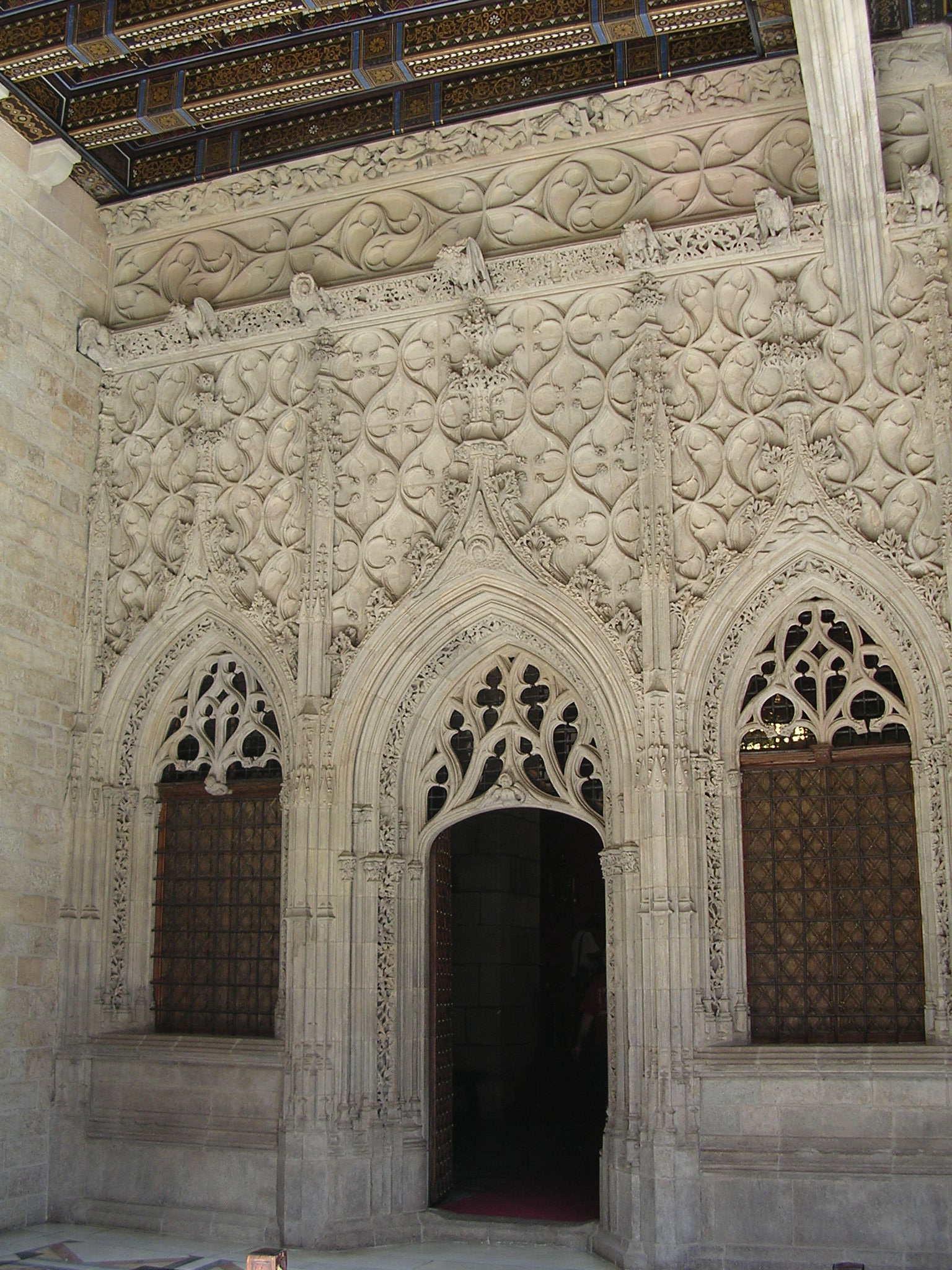
The tracery of the Saint George Chapel, at the Palau de la Generalitat de Catalunya in Barcelona depicts smaller frontispieces framing windows and side entrances commonly known as pediments.

In architecture, the term frontispiece is used to describe the principal face of the building, usually referring to a combination of elements that frame and decorate the main or front entrance of a building. The earliest and most notable variation of frontispieces can be seen in Ancient Greek Architecture which features a large triangular gable, known as a pediment, usually supported by a collection of columns. However, some architectural authors have often used the term "frontispiece" and "pediment" interchangeably in reference to both large frontispieces decorating the main entrances, as well as smaller frontispieces framing windows which is traditionally known as a pediment.

Frontispieces in pre-20th century architecture were considered decorative and ornamental structures used predominantly to dignify the façades of the building rather than for any structural or practical purpose. With the proliferation of minimalistic ideas in 21st century architecture, a large emphasis is placed on simplicity and practicality when designing the façades of buildings. Traditional decorative frontispieces are rarely used in the designing of post-modern buildings.

Frontispieces from different eras can be distinguished by the different variations of pediments used (triangular, segmented, open or broken pediments), as well as the ornamentation of the columns corresponding to a particular architectural era.

== Etymology ==
The word frontispiece describes the "decorated entrance of a building" and is historically derived from the Medieval Latin word frontispicium meaning the façade or exterior of the building.

The word frontispicium stems from the latin frons meaning ‘forehead or front’ and specere meaning ‘to look at'. As a whole, the word took on the meaning: ‘a view of the forehead, judgement of character through facial features’. Incorporated into the architectural sphere, it signifies the physical characteristics of the exterior of a building, especially pertaining to the architectural ornaments surrounding the entrance.

Traditionally according to The Complete Dictionary of Arts and Sciences, frontispieces should be used in reference to ornaments and structures specifically on the principle face of the building, while pediments should be used to describe smaller ornamentation above gates, windows, doors, etc. especially ones with 'a triangular space that forms the gable of a low-pitched roof and that is usually filled with relief sculpture in classical architecture'.

In modern day architecture, the frontispiece of a building is often referred to as the "façade" of the building. Some architectural authors have also interchangeably used "frontispiece" with the word "pediment" in recent years given the similar nature of the ornaments involved.

== Frontispieces in literature ==
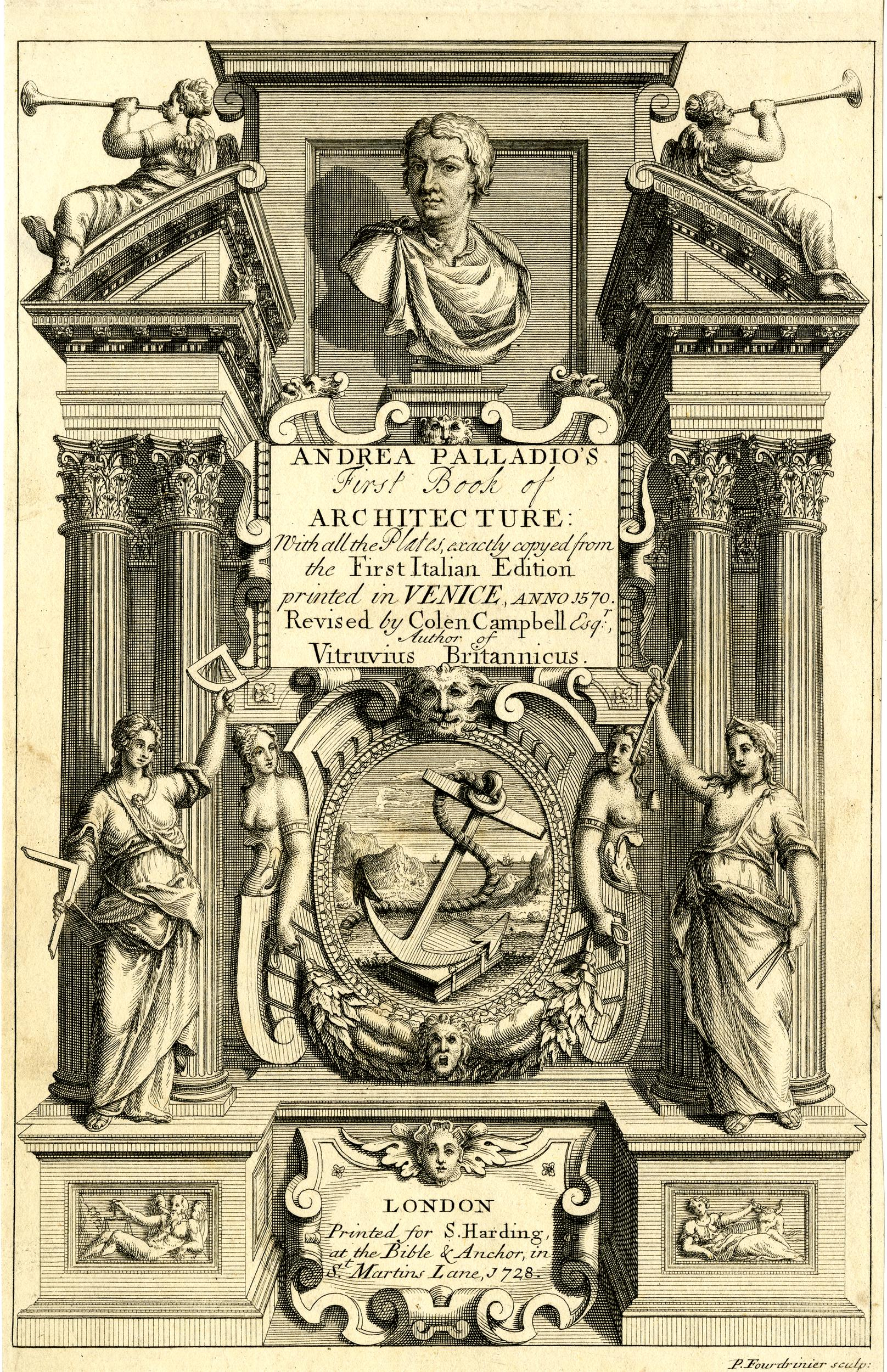
This is the Frontispiece to Campbell's edition of Palladio's First Book of Architecture. There are architectural influences in the broken pediment sat atop coupled Corinthian columns. This image also features a portrait of Palladio (the author), himself, in the manner of a classical statue.

From the 17th century, the word "frontispiece" became synonymous to the small illustrations facing the title page of a book or the ornaments on the title page itself. Illustrations creating the frontispiece of a book would often borrow stylistic elements from architecture such as drawings of columns and architectural ornaments. Following this development, authors began using the frontispieces of books, usually one of the only illustrations in the books during that period, to imply and communicate their perspectives and intentions as it was seen as the reader’s first gateway and glimpse into the book— namely to put their literary stamp in their book as artists did with their works of art during that period.

== Function and elements ==
During the classical era between the 8th century BC and 6th century AD, frontispieces often consisted of a triangular gable, more specifically called the pediment of the building, which sat atop columns. Elaborate frontispieces were often only present on the façades of sacred buildings such as temples and tombs. Especially seen in ancient Greece and Rome, frontispieces were often used to depict mythological gods or even important figures in society depending on the purpose and patrons of the building.

In the 21st century, frontispieces were more commonly used in reference to small frontispieces above windows and doors serving the pure purpose of ornamentation. The smaller frontispieces of this period often feature engaged columns, which are partly embedded in the wall of the façade.

=== Columns ===
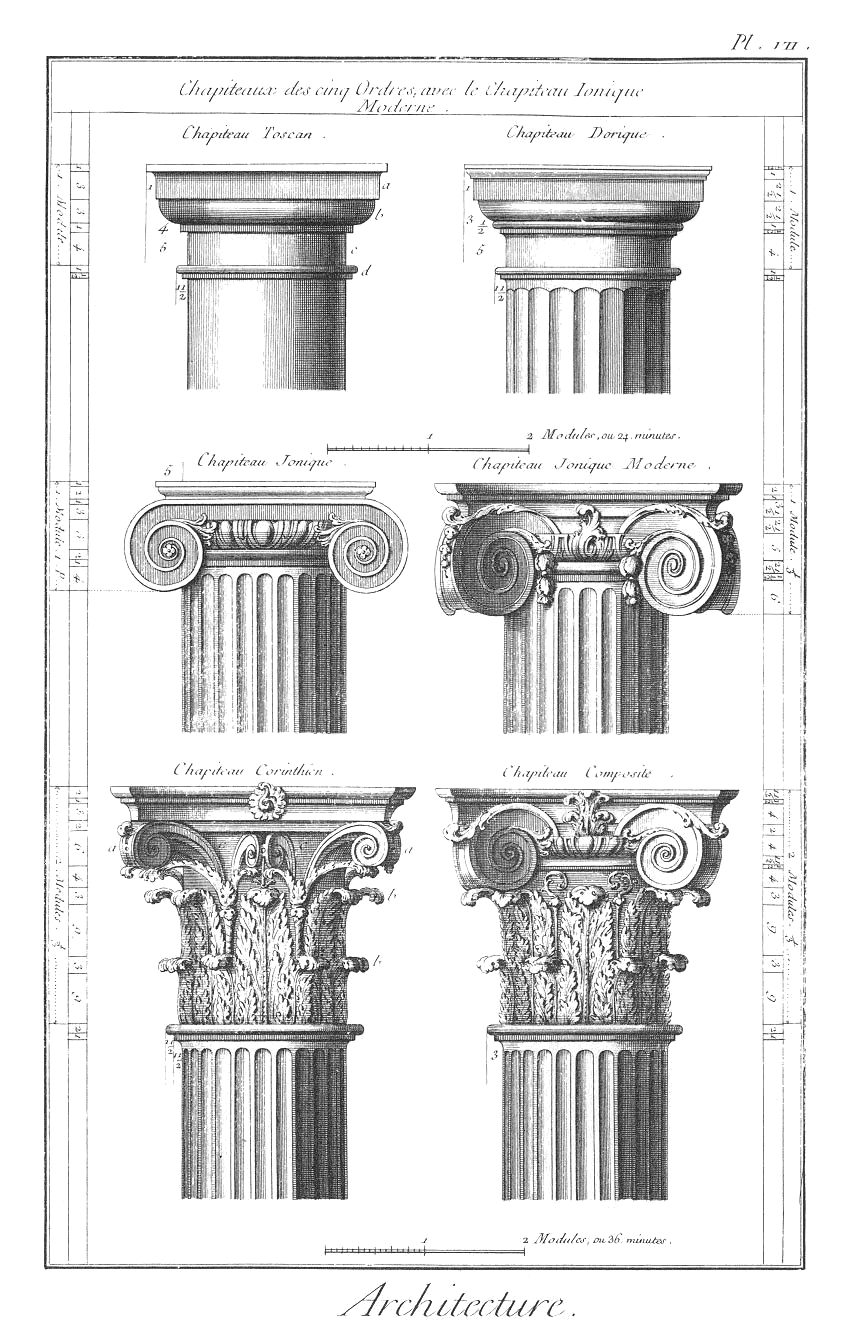
An 18th Century image from the Encyclopédie vol. 18 depicts the main variations of classical orders in architecture.

The style of the columns, often known as the architectural orders, found bracketing the entrance of buildings, is often used as one of the distinguishing features between frontispieces of different architectural periods.

=== Pediments ===
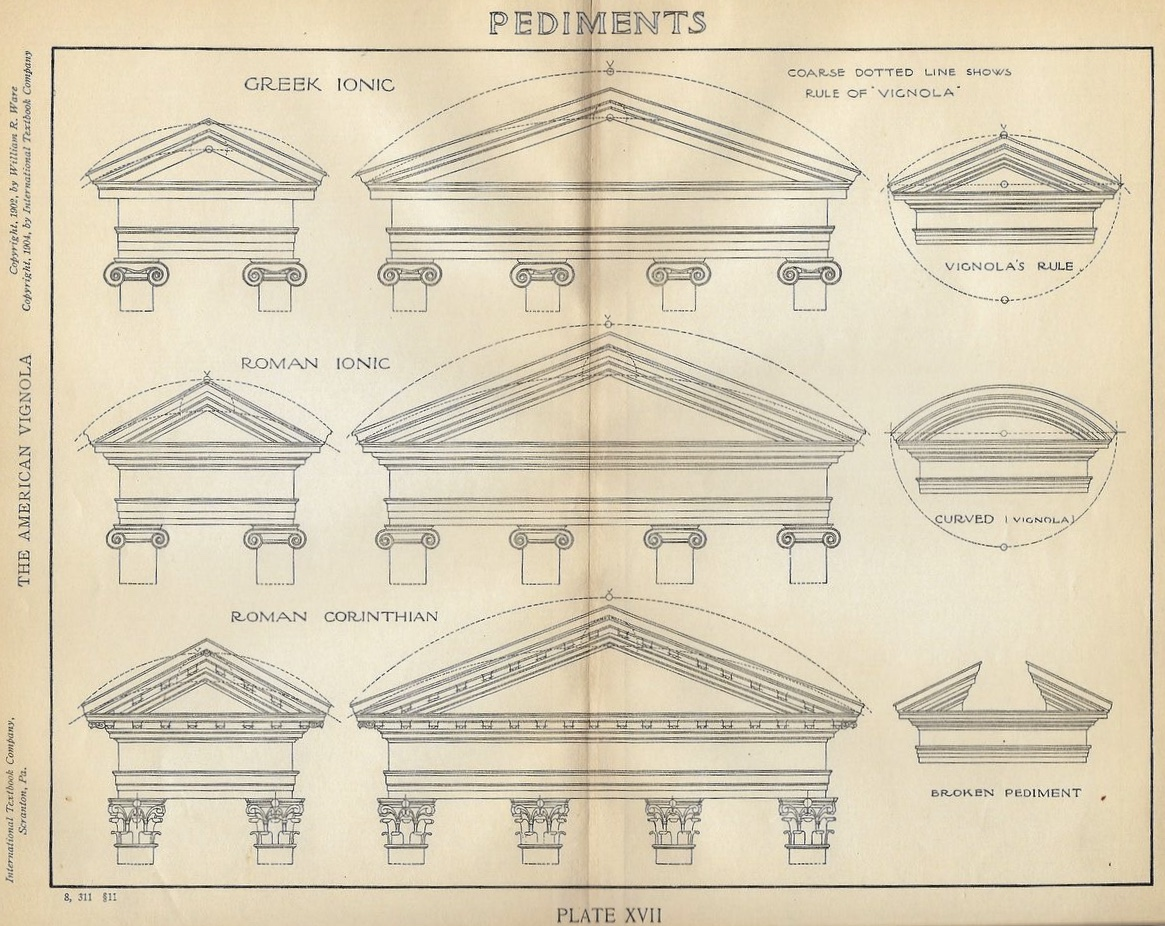
These illustrations depict some of the varying types of pediments and columns commonly found in Ancient Greek and Ancient Roman Architecture.

Another distinguishing feature of frontispieces is the style of pediments used which can range from triangular pediments, segmental pediments, open pediments to broken pediments.

Triangular pediments, often the most commonly used style of pediment features a triangle framed by a cornice or ledge, with the apex at the top, two symmetrical straight lines sloping to the ends of the horizontal cornice. Segmental pediments, also called round or curved pediments have a rounded cornice replacing two sides of the traditional triangular pediment. Open pediments can be distinguished by the absent or nearly absent strong horizontal line (cornice) of the pediment. Broken pediments, made prominent in Baroque Architecture, can be identified by their non-continuous triangular outline, usually open at the top apex. One of the prominent variations of a broken pediment is a swan-necked or ram's head pediment which has a highly ornamented S-shape.

Triangular Pediment

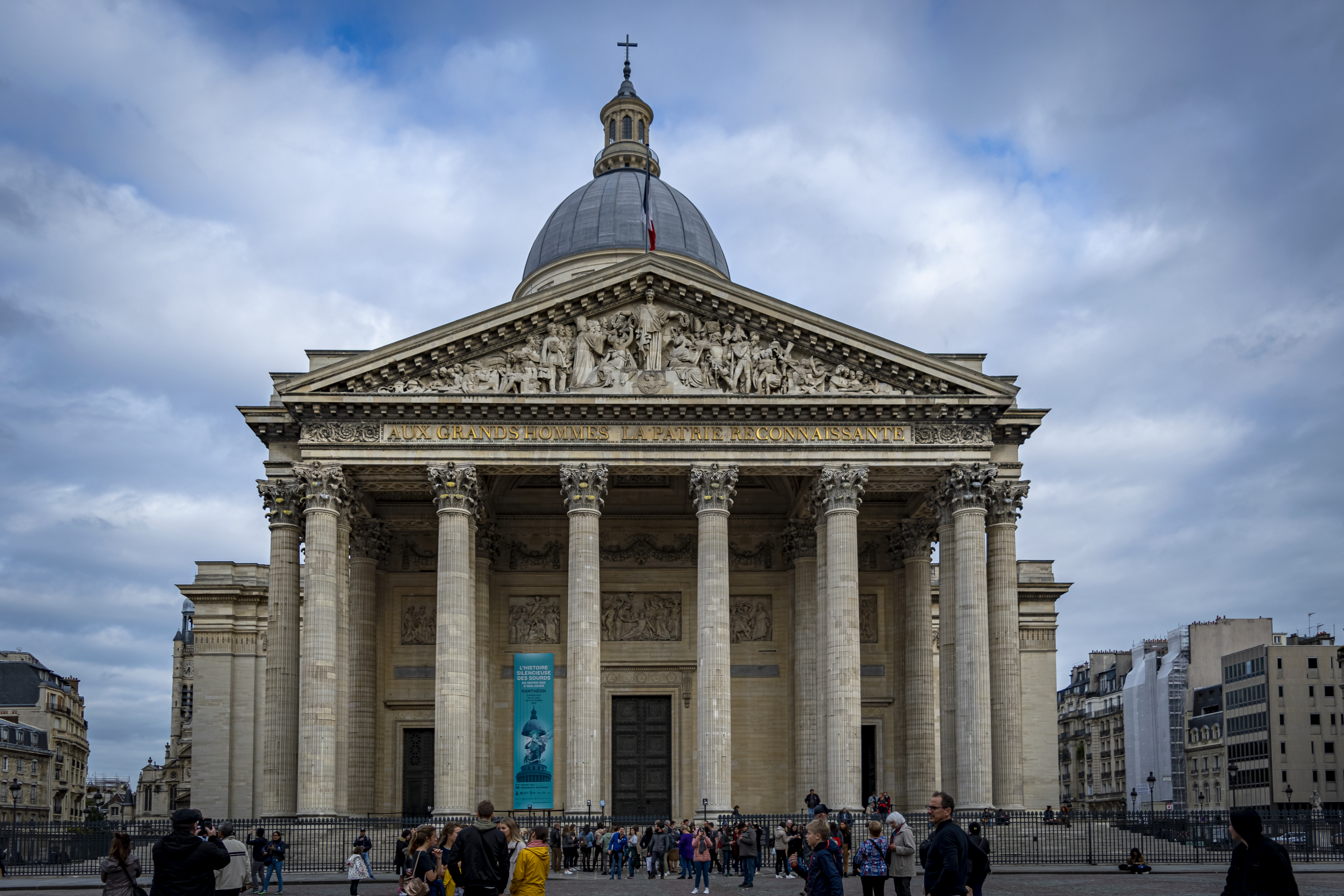
The façade of the Panthéon in Paris features a triangular pediment, featuring two symmetrical straight lines sloping to the ends of a horizontal cornice.

Segmental (curved) Pediment

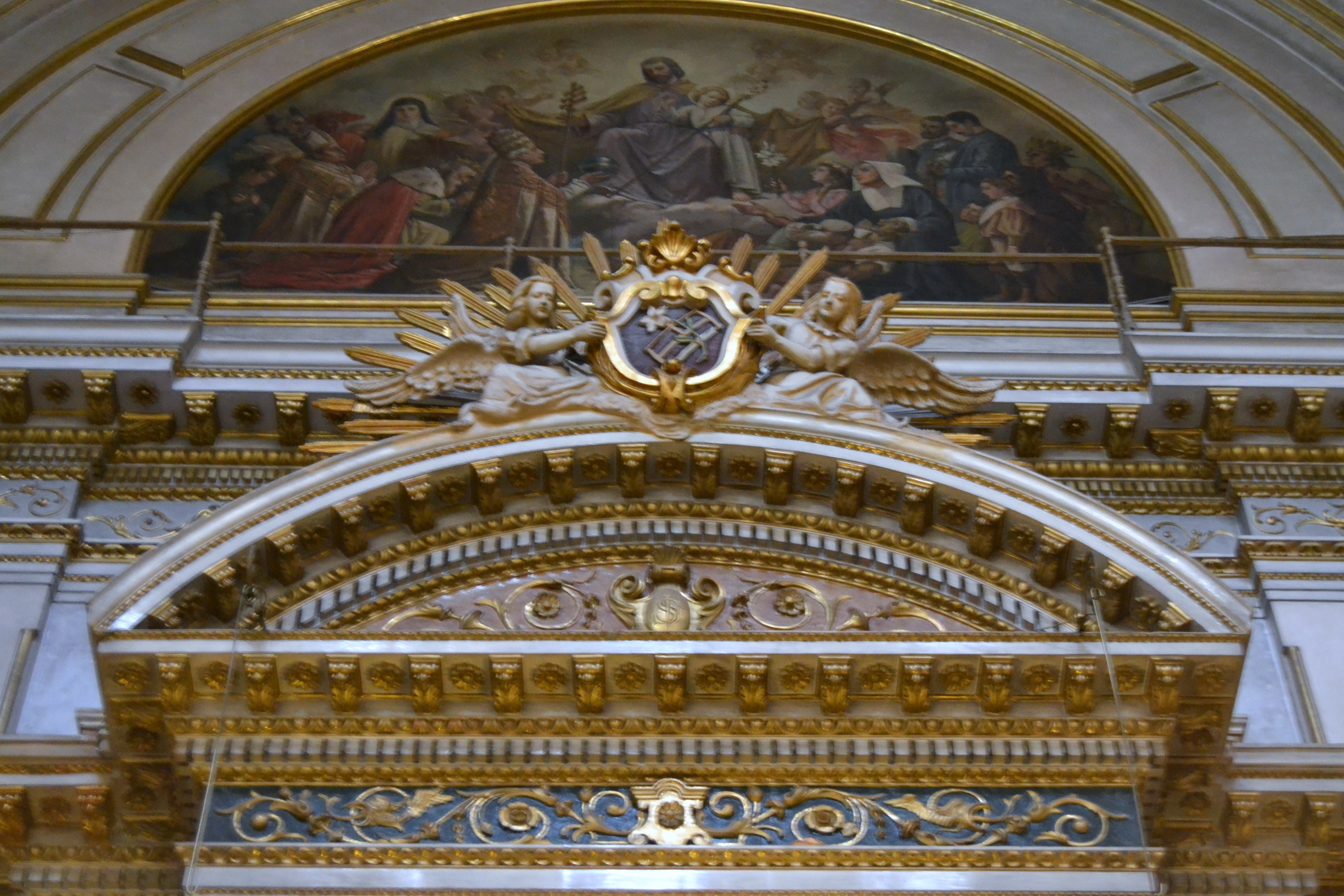
The decorative pediment of the Valencia Cathedral, Spain, features a segmental or curved pediment

Open Pediment

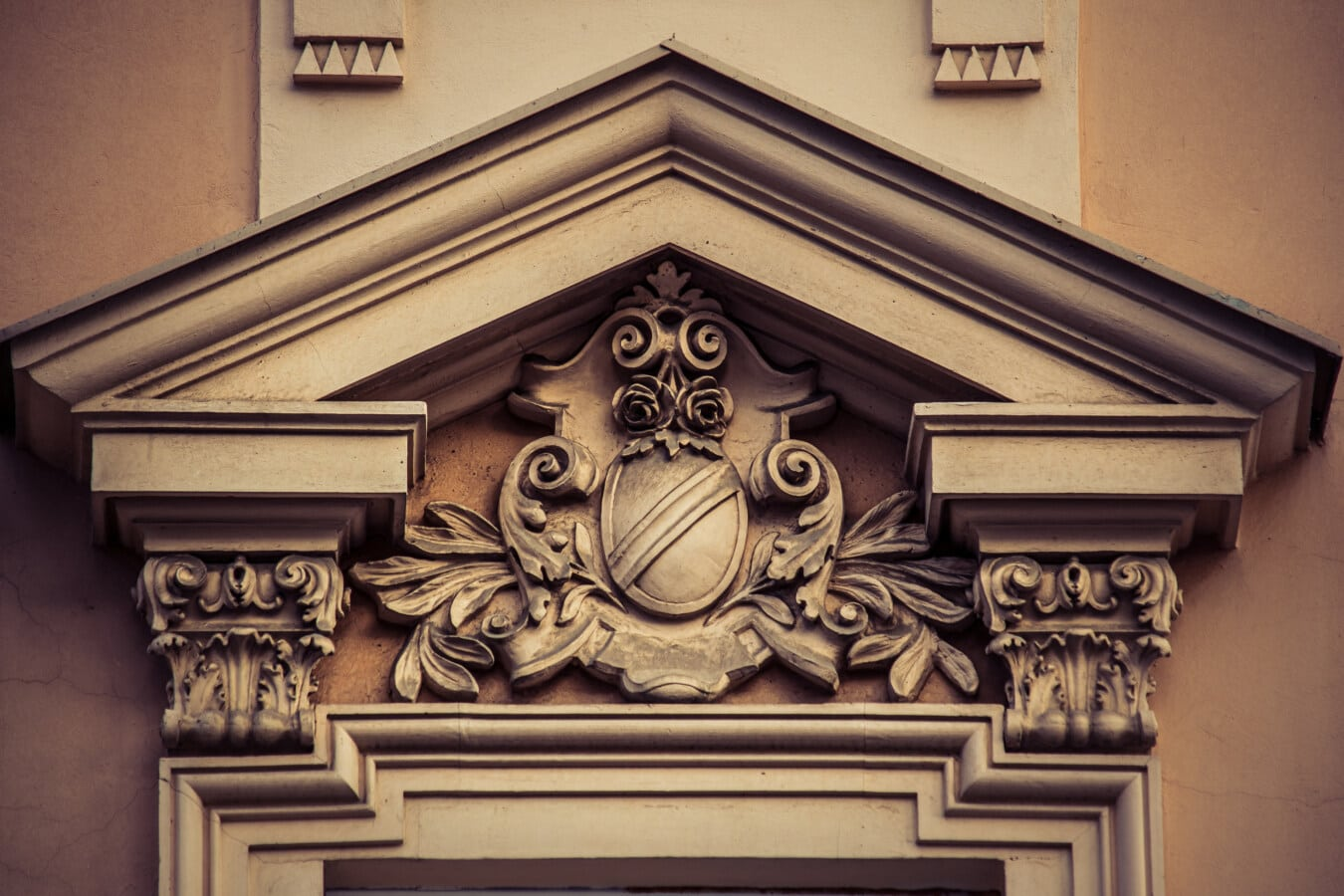
This image features an open pediment where the usual strong horizontal line (at the bottom) of the pediment is incomplete and filled by an emblem.

Broken Pediment

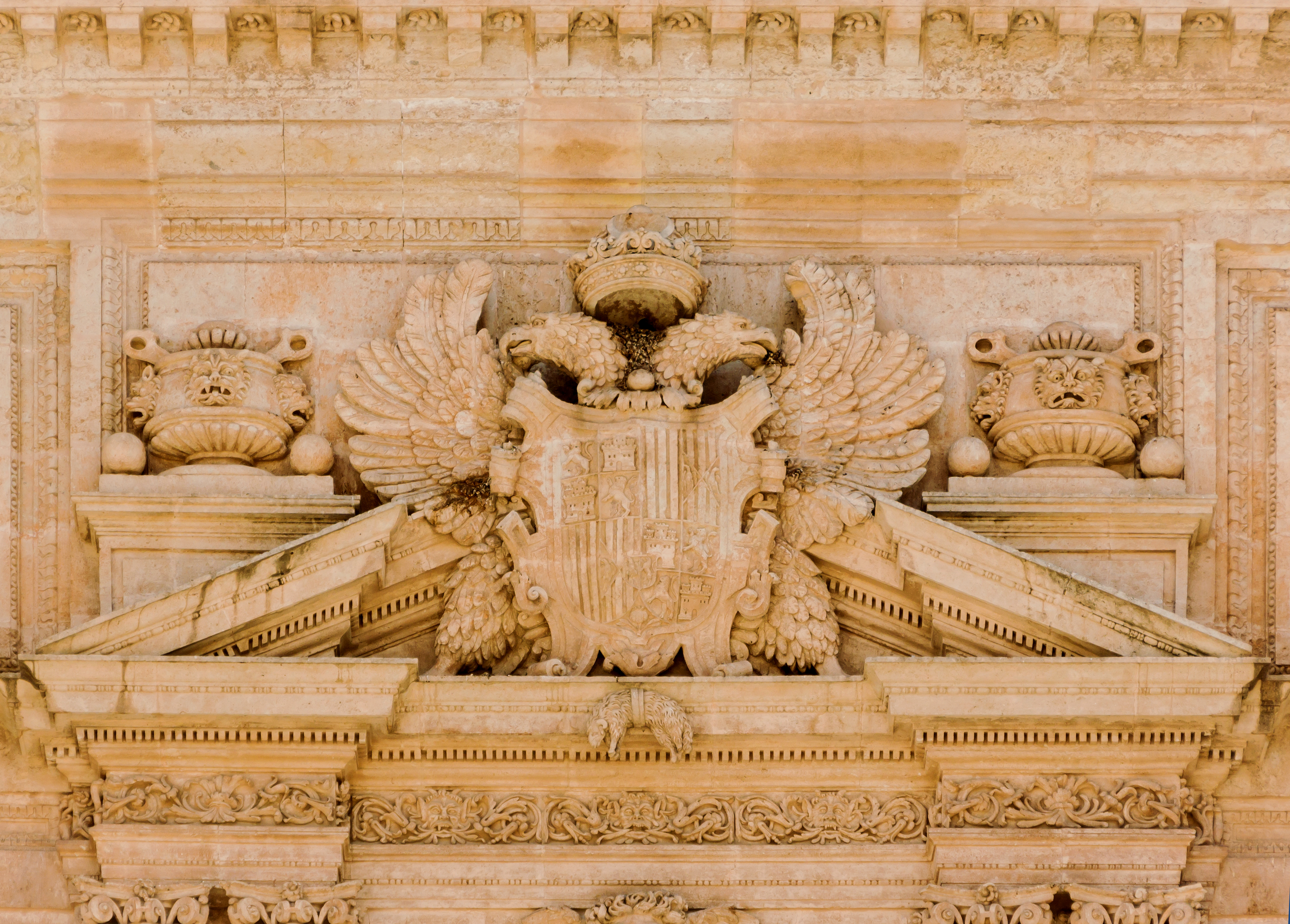
The frontispiece of the Cathedral of Almería features a broken pediment where the top of the usual triangular outline is broken by an emblem of a double headed eagle.

== Development and history of frontispieces ==
=== Classical architecture [8th century BC – 6th century AD] ===
In its classical form, the frontispiece of a building is commonly used to describe the ‘gable surmounting the façade of an ancient temple in classical architecture’ which is now often known as a pediment and used as ornaments to the entrance of a building. During this era, frontispieces were used to describe ornaments on the principle face of the building and were predominantly used above large columns in the entrance, making up a large part of the façade of the building.

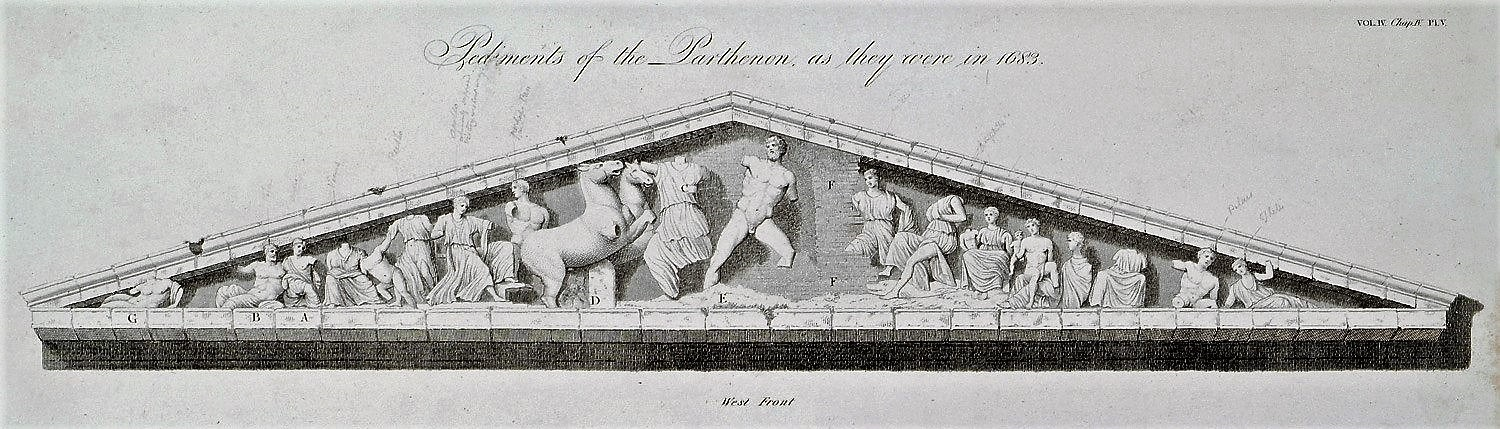
This image features a reconstruction of the west pediment of the Parthenon depicting the mythological gods, Athena and Poseidon quarrelling for Athens and Attica.

The Colosseum in Rome features superimposed orders, where successive storeys of the building have different variations of columns. This style of façades was developed in ancient Greece and Rome and later used in the Renaissance era architecture.

In Greek architecture, frontispieces can refer to both large ornamentation on the triangular tops of buildings as well as smaller frontispieces. Larger frontispieces found on the front façades of sacred buildings often depicted mythological gods or important figures in history depending on the purpose, and patronage, of the building. The Parthenon, built in Ancient Athens, is one of the most recognisable examples of a classically designed frontispiece. Built in 447BC, the ionic pediments of the Parthenon primarily featured Greek mythology and lore surrounding the Greek goddess, Athena, who was the patron of the Ancient city of Athens and the Parthenon.

Classical elements such as superimposed orders, which refers to the architectural system of using different styles of columns for each storey of a building, was introduced and often used for decorative functions in classical architecture. One of the most popular examples of superimposed orders was on the classical façade of the Colosseum. Built in 70AD, the Colosseum featured an arrangement of orders on a classical frontispiece of several storeys, set one above the other with each storey corresponding to a particular architectural order.

=== Romanesque architecture [6th–11th century AD] ===
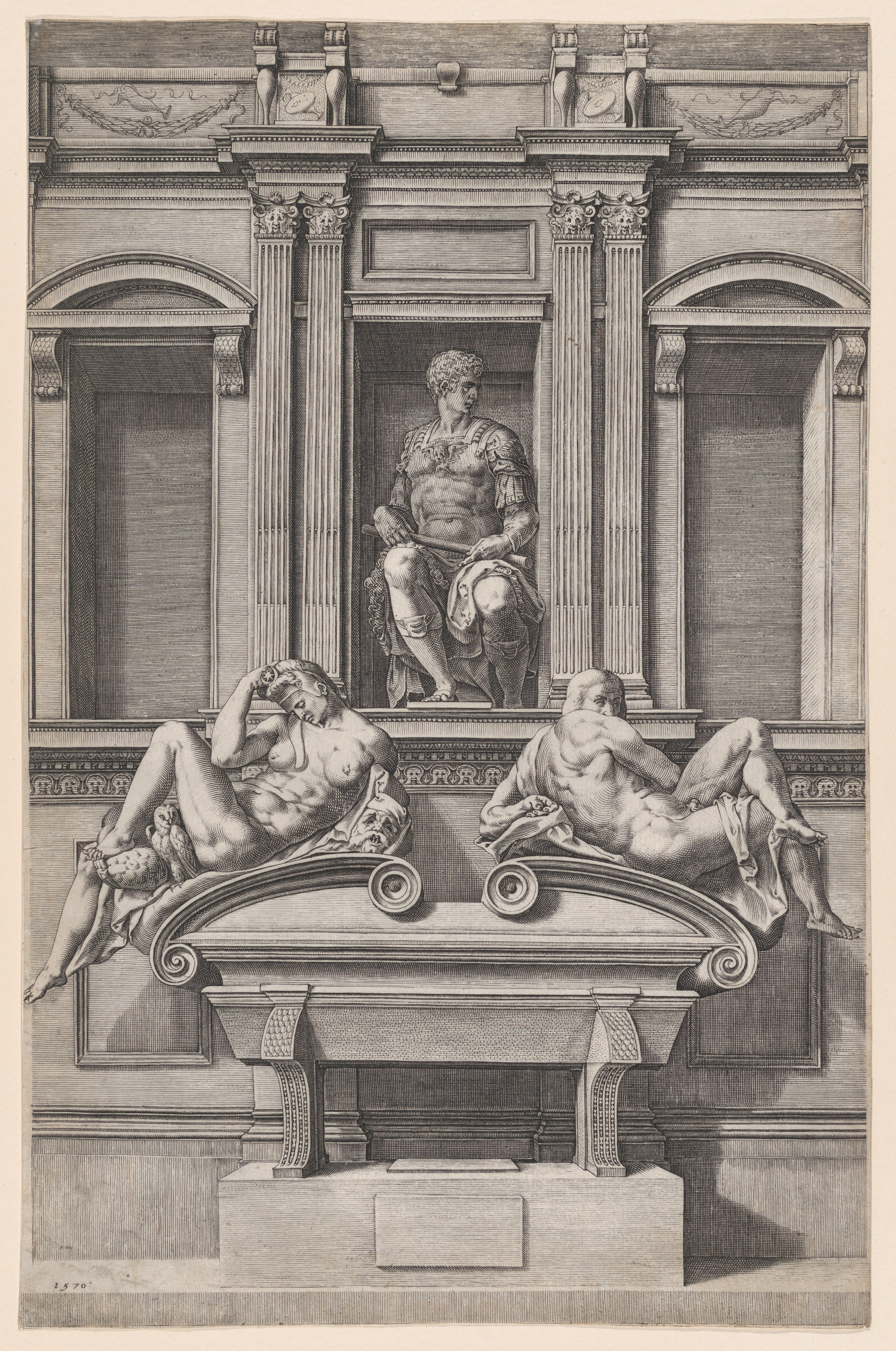
A drawing of the tomb of Giuliano de' Medici in the Medici Chapel (originally sculpted by Michelangelo) features smaller, more ornamental frontispieces with a segmental, curved pediment on either side of the coupled columns.

The move from the typical triangular pediments to segmental, curved pediments is seen in the carvings on the imperial sarcophagi in Rome which depicts the architecture of the era. Romanesque architecture also popularised the use of smaller, ornamental frontispieces surrounding windows. Many well-preserved examples of Roman influenced frontispieces can be found in Provence, France due to the use of ‘fine quality building stone’ while others constructed with a decorative veneer were quickly lost.

Romanesque influences in frontispieces can also be seen in the aerarium, treasury of ancient Rome, which features classical Roman architecture with both traditional triangular pediments as well as elaborate broken pediments.

The Tombs of Lorenzo and Giulano de’Medici sculpted by Michelangelo also features etchings of frontispiece styles popular during this era which include the use of smaller, decorative frontispieces with curved pediments.

=== Renaissance architecture [early 14th – 16th century AD] ===
Renaissance Architecture, which ushered a revival of ancient Greek and Roman classical architectural forms, saw the introduction and proliferation of classical elements, which included the frequent usage of large columns and pediments. Classical elements, such as superimposed orders, were reintroduced in the sixteenth century to dignify the entrances to some important houses and some collegiate buildings.

In the late 1520s to early 1530s, there was a revival of the heavy use of dense classical ornaments on the frontispieces which can be seen on the facade of Hengrave Hall, Suffolk, England built in 1538, as well as the addition of elements distinctive of the Italian Renaissance such as the use of terracotta moulded decorative elements featured on the façade of the hall entrance to Richard Weston’s Sutton Place, Surrey, built in 1533.

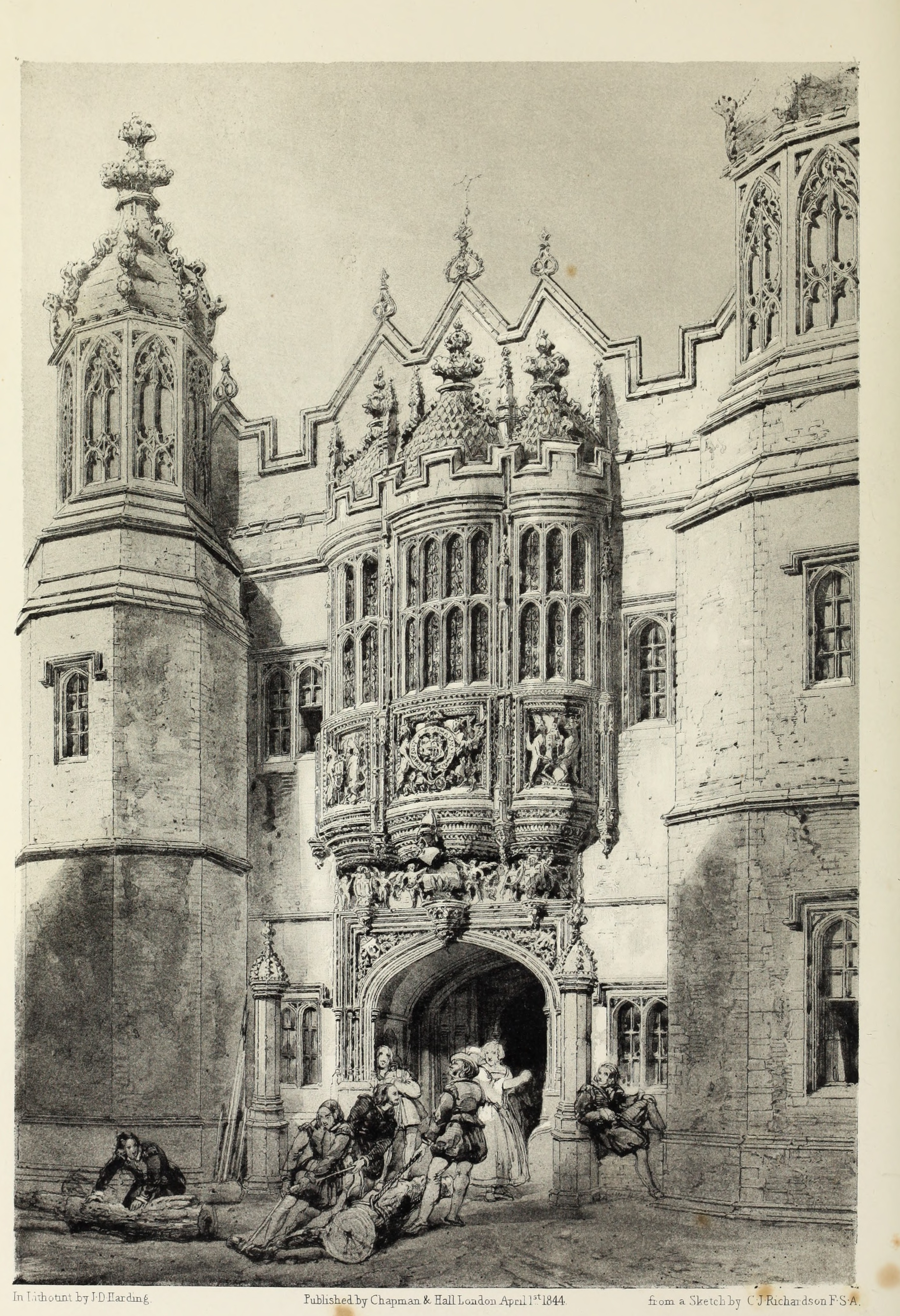
The classical decor above the entrance of Hengrave Hall depicts the dense ornaments used in a frontispiece designed in the Early Renaissance Era.

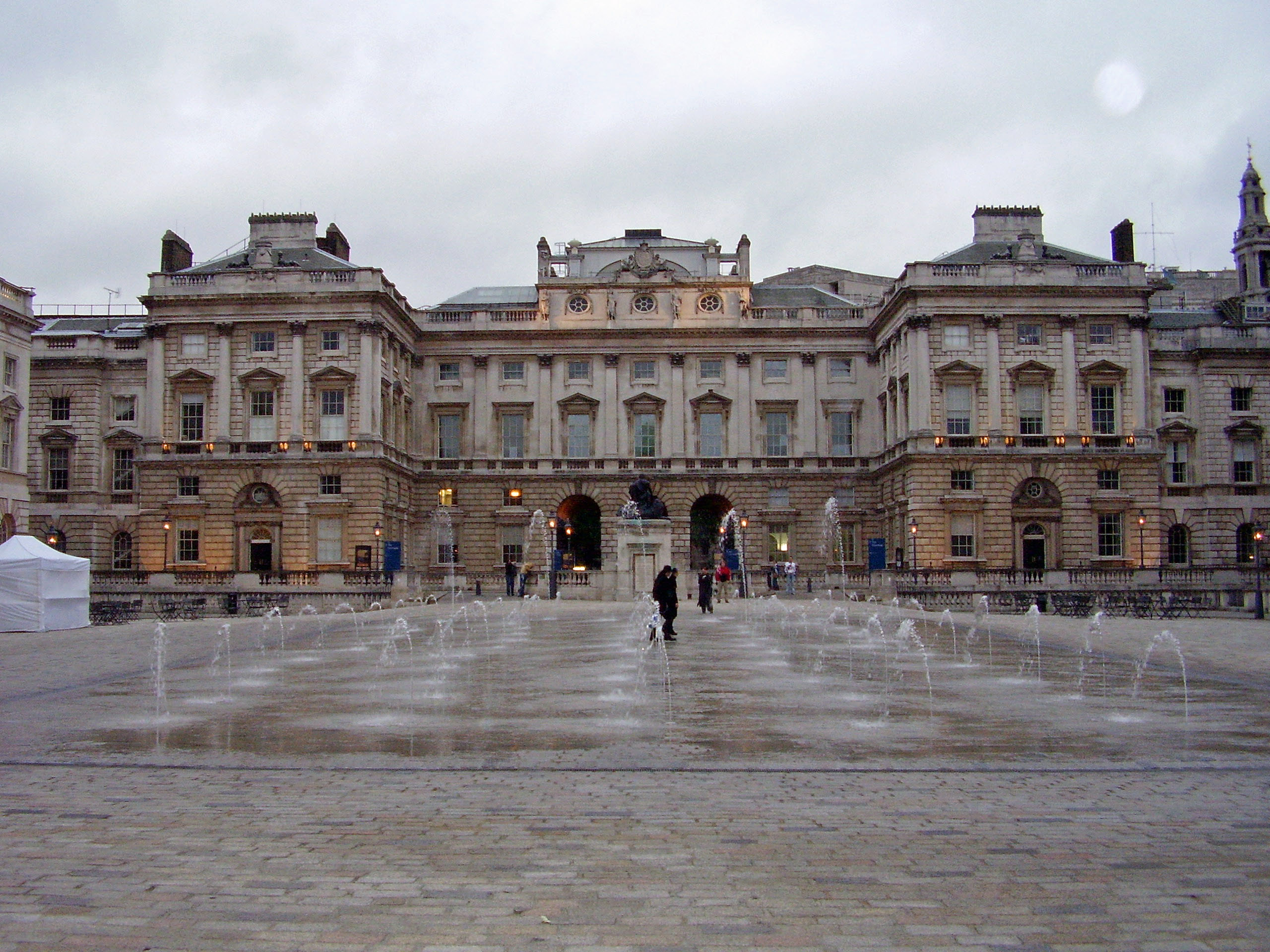
This image Somerset House, London showcases rejuvenation of classical antiquities such as the use of superimposed orders, classical Roman triumphal arches and prominent use of columns.

In the mid-16th century, the building of Old Somerset House was considered one of "the first deliberate attempts to build, in England, a front composed altogether in the classical taste" and was "unquestionably one of the most influential buildings of the English Renaissance." Although there was nothing new about the principle features of the façade, the stylistic attempts at consistency and symmetry in the structure of the frontispiece showed the growing awareness, during the late renaissance era in England, for 'regularity in planning and greater visual unity and symmetry' and a 'consistent use of the classical orders'. The three-storey frontispiece prominently placed at the centre of the façade of the Old Somerset House comprised a gateway in the form of a triumphal arch with superimposed orders and columns flanking windows the structure of which can be traced back to the arch in Castel Nuovo, Naples, borrowing the triumphal arch motif from Roman antiquity.

In contrast to the predominantly decorative functions of frontispieces in the Classical Era, the sixteenth century also brought the introduction of the first classical portico to England at St Paul's Cathedral, which was design by Inigo Jones. The portico served the more practical and structural purpose of providing a covered walkway at the entrance of the building.

It was noted by Richard John Riddell, who analysed entrance-porticos in English Renaissance architecture, that the most impressive and architecturally sophisticated frontispieces were often set against houses 'by men who enjoyed or aspired to preferment and high office, with the immense political power and social prestige, and by academics who wished to give permanent expression to the distinction of their college and university'. Frontispieces of this nature were purely for applied and decorative functions, even the 'fullest extent of the role of the columns in their load-bearing capacity was to hold up each other and not the building'.

=== Baroque architecture [17th – mid 18th century AD] ===
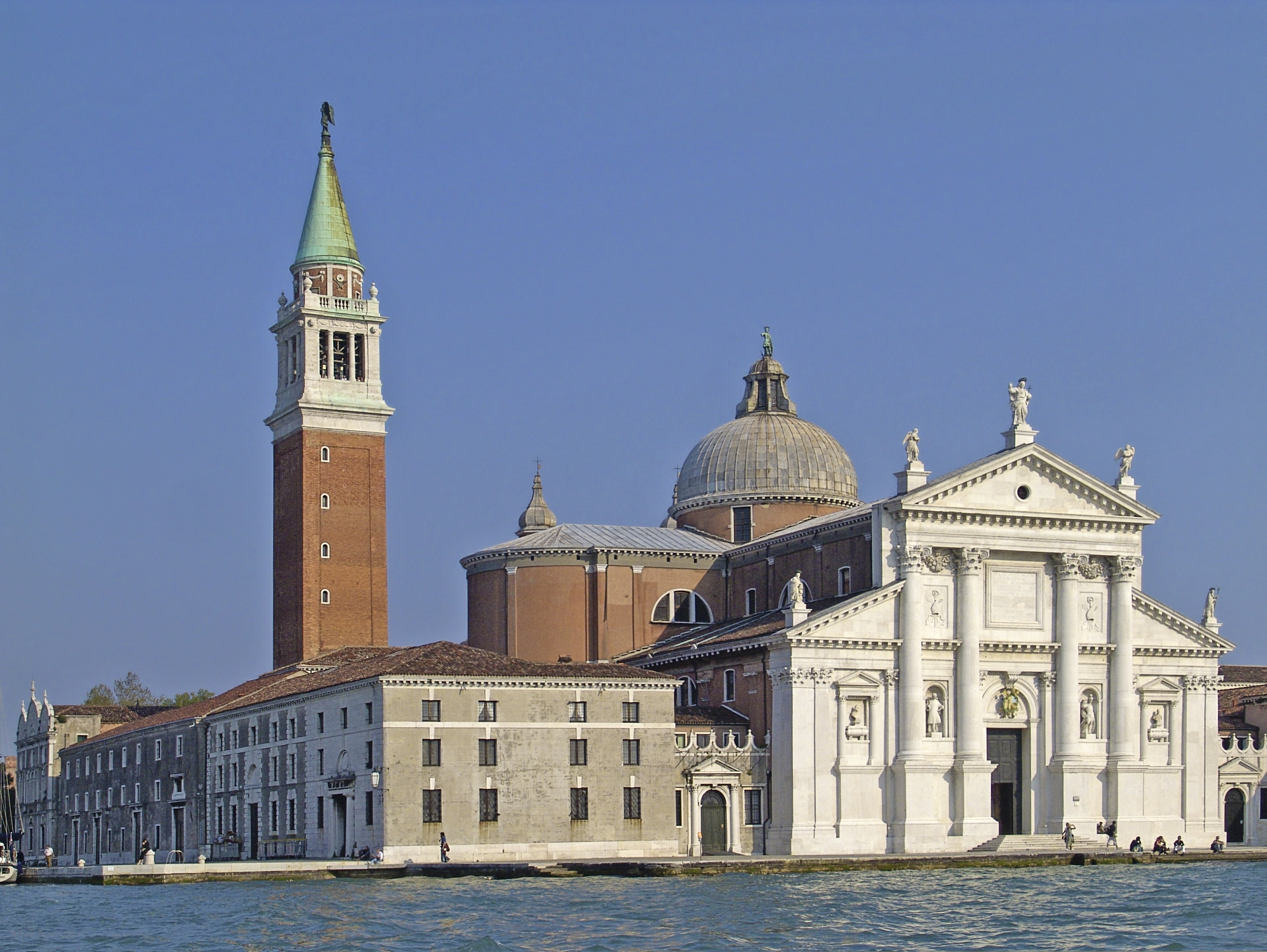
The white façade of the Church of San Giorgio Maggiore depicts a baroque influenced architectural frontispiece, featuring an unusual broken pediment as it is the result of superimposing two temple fronts, resulting in a triangular pediment (above) ‘breaking’ the bottom pediment.

In baroque architecture, frontispieces also took on semi-oval structures which decorated the tops of the entrances with added embellishments synonymous to the household or building. Frontispieces during this period featured more opulent and theatric style in ornamentation and grandeur as was common during the era. During this period, the use of broken frontispieces and heavy ornaments was featured in many of the buildings. This is seen in Palácio do Freixo designed by Nicolò Nasoni, who was heavily influenced by the baroque architecture. Another known example of this is seen in Andrea Palladio’s Church of San Giorgio Maggiore, in Venice which features an unusual broken pediment as it is the result of superimposing two temple fronts.

=== Neoclassical architecture [mid-18th – early 19th century AD] ===
In the late 18th century to the 19th century, neoclassical frontispieces were often described as ‘a portion of the façade of a building, that is slightly raised from the rest of the building’ using engaged columns with lighter ornamentation. Frontispieces during the neoclassical era commonly consisted of simple geometric shapes with a large emphasis on the use of columns, especially Doric columns.

=== Post-modernism architecture [late 20th – 21st century AD] ===
In the 20th century post-modernism era, buildings such as the Marco Polo House designed by Ian Pollard and the 550 Madison Avenue building designed by Philip Johnson feature large scale broken pediments at the top of their buildings providing a post-modern take on broken pediments often found in baroque architecture.

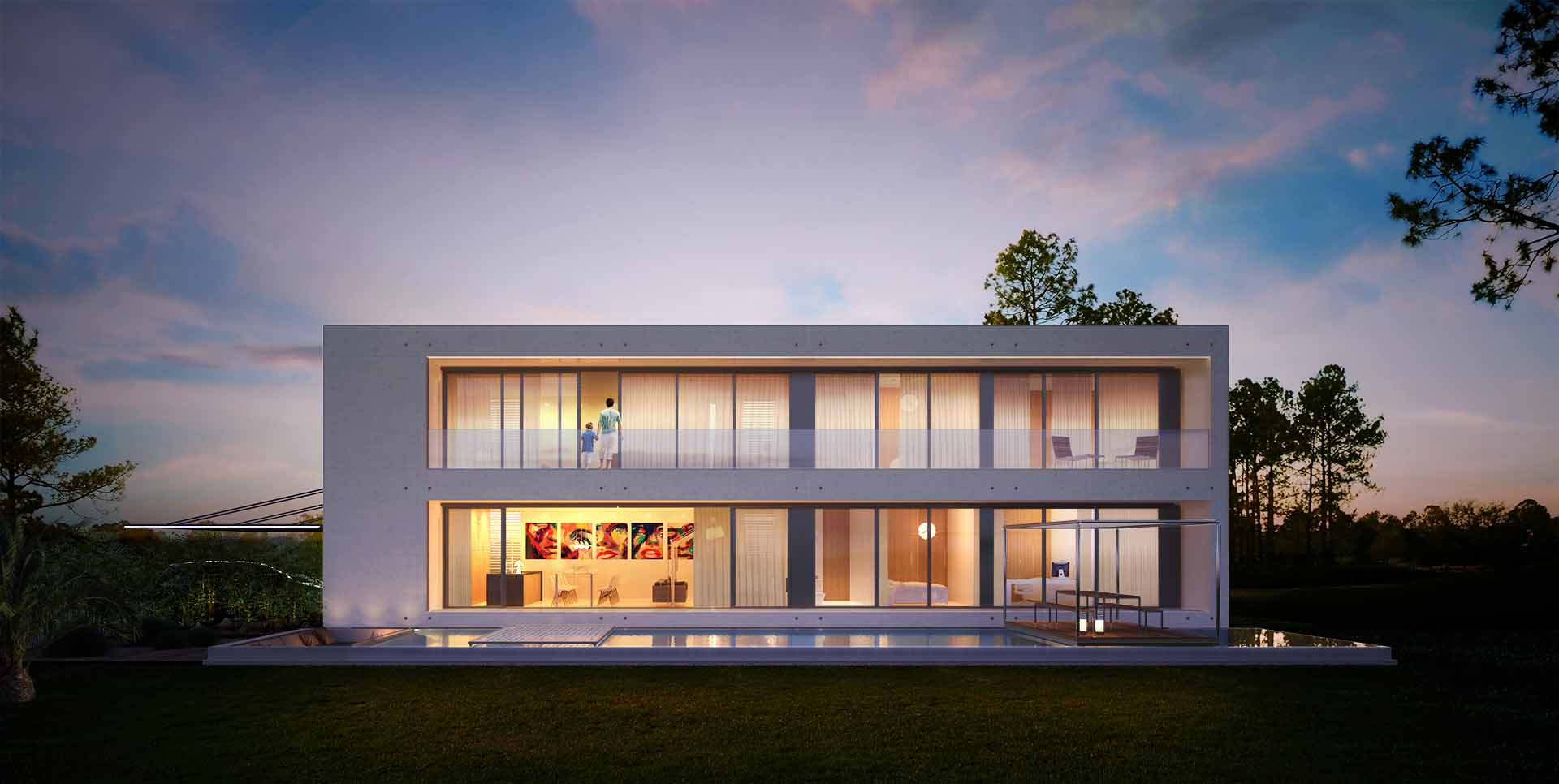
A modern façade incorporating minimalistic elements such as clean structural lines and lack of decorative ornaments.

Though some architects have designed buildings modernising on architectural styles and structures of the past, architecture of the 21st century seems to be moving in the direction of minimalism, contrary to grandiose nature of frontispieces seen from the Classical Era to the Neoclassical Era. Minimalism in architecture is often characterised by the rejection of ornament and the ‘emphasis on rational use and function’ and popularised in the late 1980s in London and New York with buildings combining clean lines and architectural profiles usually tied to iconic geometry.

These moves towards minimalism can be seen in the proliferation of the Wabi-sabi aesthetics, popularised in Japan which translates roughly to ‘the elegant beauty of humble simplicity’, encapsulating Taoist and Buddhist ideologies of accepting nature and ‘favouring the imperfect and incomplete in everything’. The Scandinavian notion of Hygge has similar roots in minimalism. Hygge designs and aesthetics are inspired by the Scandinavian landscape of fjords, forests and mountains and are characterised by mild colour palettes consisting of pewter grays, soft pastel shades with flashes of bright metallic shades.
