= Superposed order =

Style of architectural order

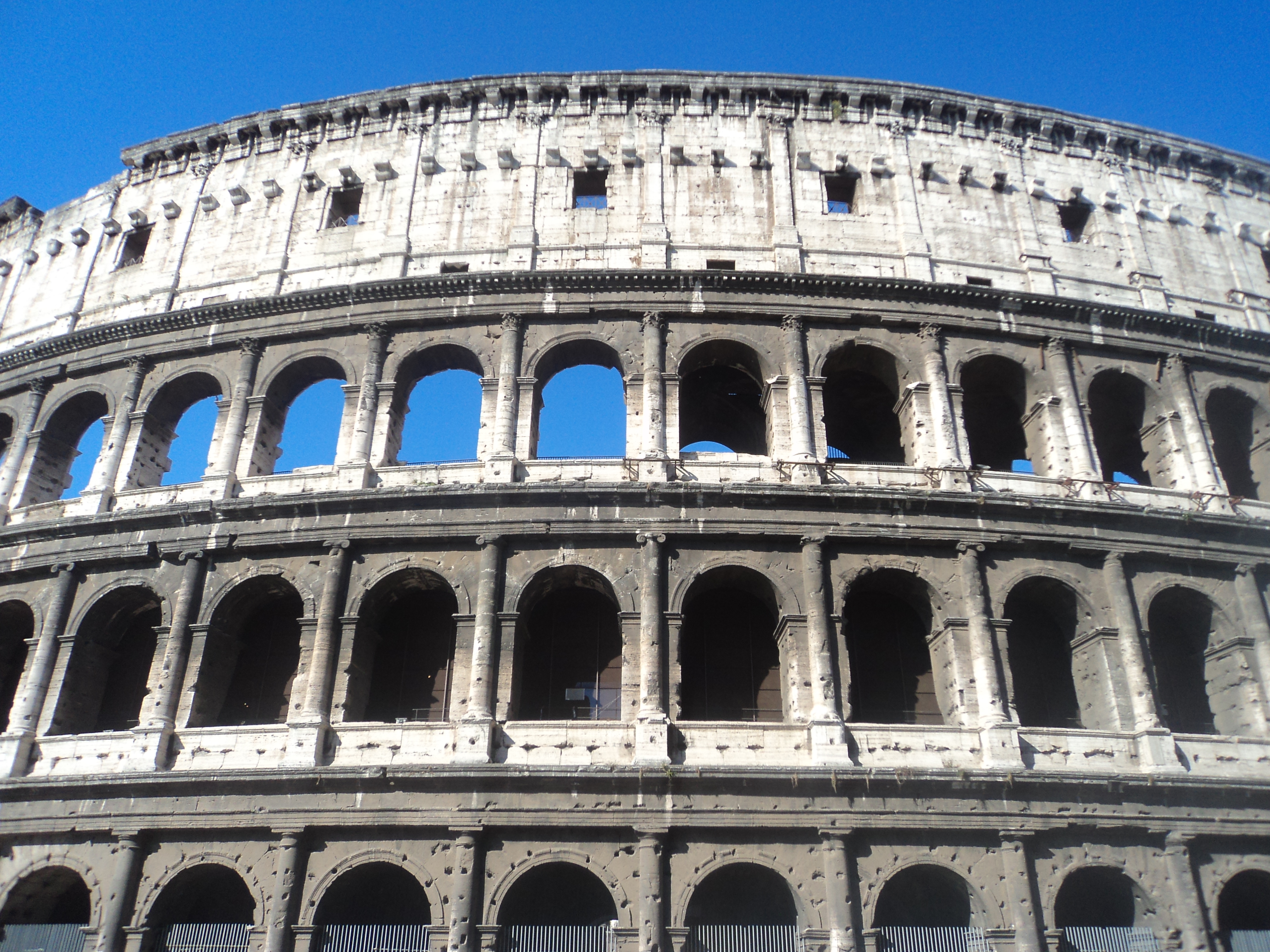
Superposed order of the Colosseum

Superposed order (also superimposed) is one where successive storeys of a building have different orders. The most famous ancient example of such an order is the Colosseum at Rome, which had no less than four storeys of superposed orders. The superposition rules were developed in ancient Greece and were also actively used in the architecture of ancient Rome. Later, the order was used in the architecture of the Renaissance and Baroque.

== Composition ==
The heaviest orders are at the bottom of a building, whilst the lightest come at the top. This rule means that the Doric order is a preferred order for the ground floor, the Ionic order is used for the middle storey, while the Corinthian or the Composite order is used for the top storey. The ground floor may also have rustication. Initially, the top story usually featured the Composite order, but, after Vincenzo Scamozzi published his treatise L'idea dell'architettura universale (The Idea of a Universal Architecture, Venice, 1615), architects switched to the Corinthian order.

The superposed order allowed storeys without columns, but rearrangement of order styles was strictly forbidden.

== Gallery ==
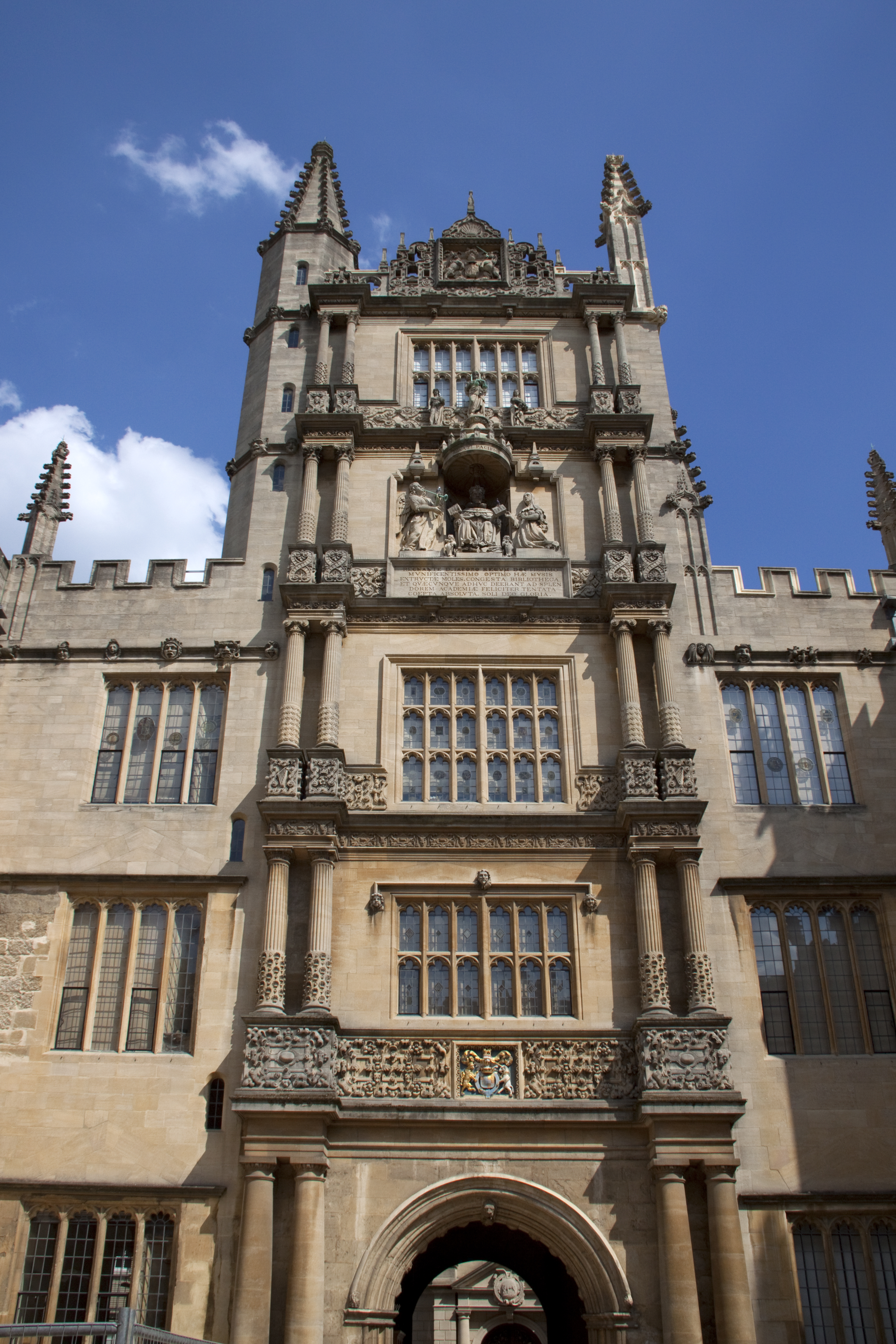
The Tower of The Five Orders at the Bodleian Library at the University of Oxford, completed in 1619, includes all the five Classical orders

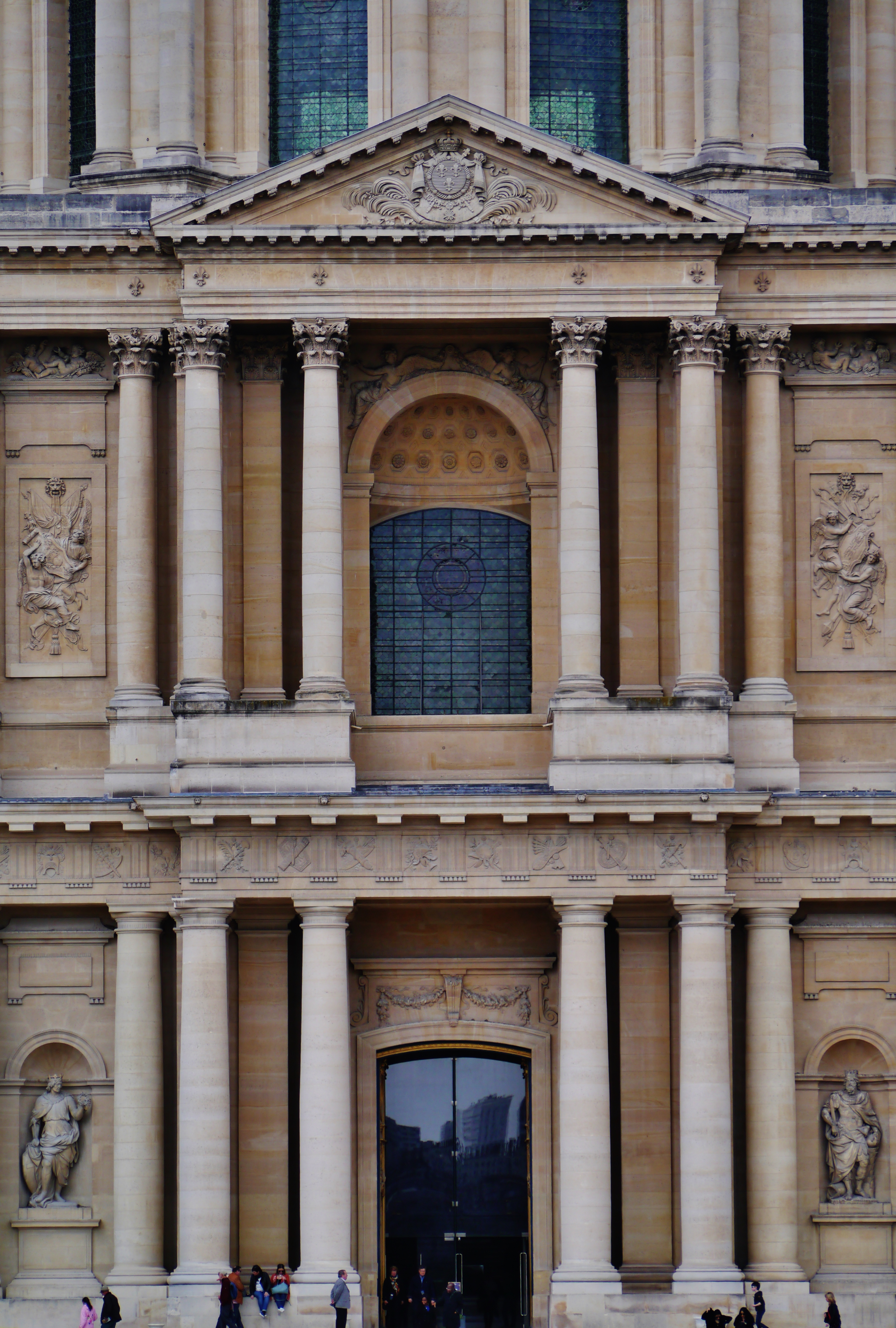
Portico of Les Invalides from Paris, an example of French Baroque architecture

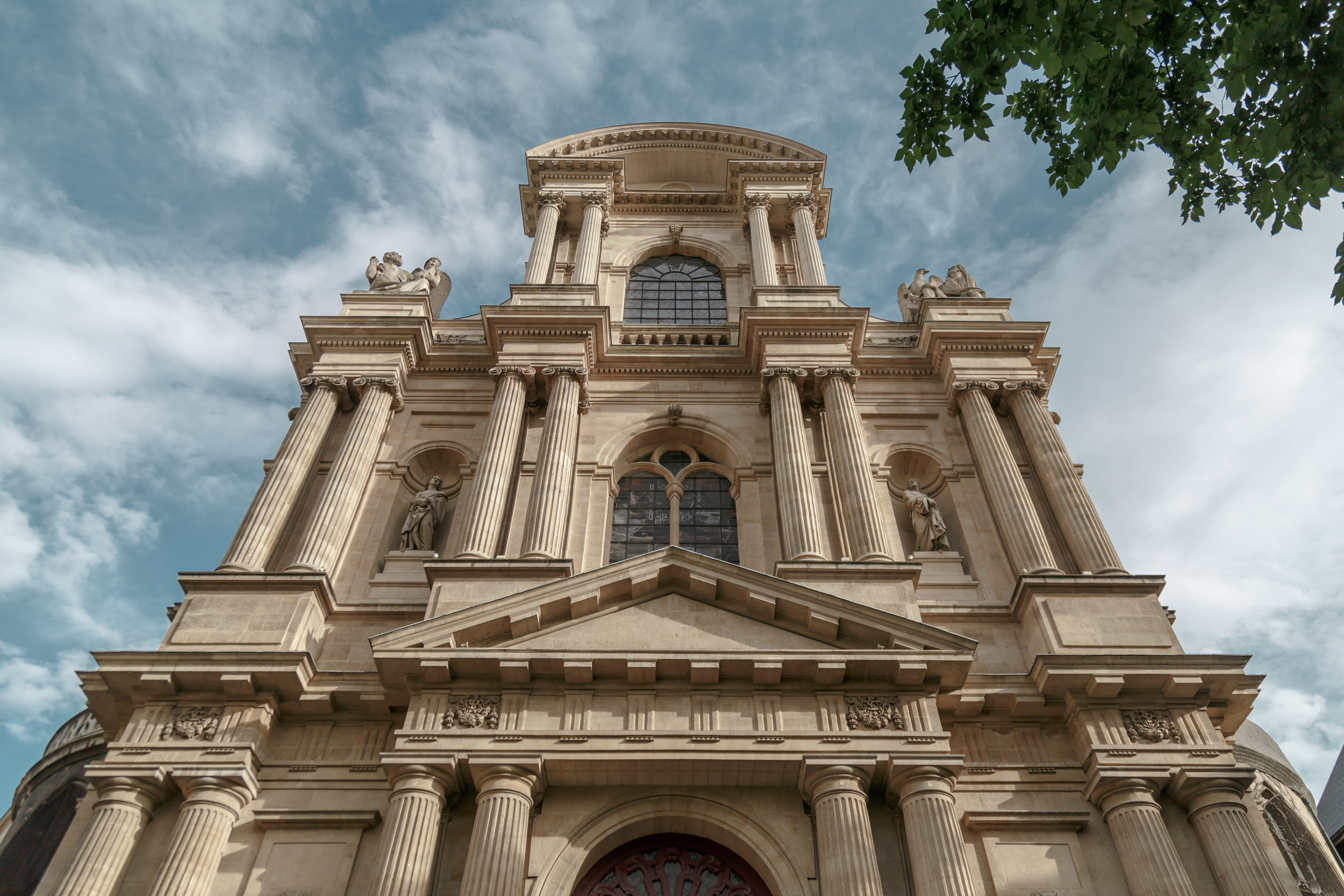
Façade of the Saint-Gervais-Saint-Protais from Paris

== See also ==
- Classical order
- Concatenation
