= FALKE Group =

German hosiery and clothing company

Falke Group
- Type: KGaA (Kommanditgesellschaft auf Aktien)
- Industry: Clothing
- Founded: 1895
- Founder: Franz Falke-Rohen
- Headquarters: Schmallenberg, Germany
- Key people: Paul Falke, Franz-Peter Falke (owners); Martin Winkler (CEO)
- Products: Hosiery, knitwear, sportswear
- Revenue: €285 million (2024)
- Number of employees: about 3,000 (2025)
- Website: www.falke.com

The Falke Group is a German family-owned manufacturer of hosiery and clothing based in Schmallenberg, North Rhine-Westphalia. Founded by Franz Falke-Rohen in 1895, it produces socks, tights, knit and sportswear.

== History ==
=== Origins ===
FALKE was founded in 1895 by Franz Falke-Rohen. A trained roofer, he worked as a seasonal knitter during the snowy Sauerland winters. Later, he decided to establish his own contract knitting business.

In 1902, his eldest son, Franz Falke Jr., joined the company. From 1906, FALKE sold hosiery under its own name and began sourcing yarn directly from spinning mills. In 1918, Franz Falke-Rohen and Franz Falke Jr. acquired the Carl Meisenburg wool and hair yarn spinning mill in Schmallenberg, which operated under the name "FALKE Garne" from 1918 to 2004. In 1920, they built a new factory for sock production on Oststraße in Schmallenberg, which still serves as FALKE Group's headquarters today. In 1928, Franz Falke-Rohen passed away, and Franz Falke Jr. assumed majority ownership.4

In 1939, Franz Falke Jr. purchased the Salomon Stern knitting factory from his Jewish school friend Arthur Stern. Today, this facility is known as FALKE Fashion. After the forced sale under National Socialist pressure, the Falke family made an additional compensation payment to the Stern family after World War II. Paul and Franz-Otto Falke jointly took over management in 1951. In 1958, the company acquired the Uhli hosiery works, together with a licence to manufacture women's hosiery for Christian Dior. Under the brothers, Falke expanded from hosiery into other areas of clothing. In the 1970s it also made hosiery for Yves Saint Laurent and Giorgio Armani.

The company's advertising used fashion photographers including F. C. Gundlach from the late 1950s, Helmut Newton in 1977–1979 and Albert Watson in 1997. Historians Karl Borromäus Murr and Michaela Breil examined these campaigns as part of Falke's development into an international fashion brand.

In the 1970s, FALKE introduced a retail concept with FALKE Pullishops and franchise stores — the FALKE Shop. Licensing partnerships are formed with brands such as Armani, Lagerfeld, Christian Dior, and Paul Smith.

Falke expanded production abroad from the 1970s. Cousins Paul Falke and Franz-Peter Falke took over in 1990, representing the fourth generation of the family. Franz-Peter Falke's daughter, Chiara Falke, of the fifth generation, has been involved in the company's decisions for several years.

In April 2008, Falke acquired certain Burlington trademark rights from International Textile Group.

In 2012, Falke opened a factory in Leskovac, Serbia, where it had also produced socks until 1992.

== Business ==
Besides its hosiery ranges, Falke manufactures knitwear and functional sports clothing. It has also produced hosiery for other fashion labels under licensing arrangements. A 2026 FashionUnited profile reported group revenue of €285 million for 2024.

In 2016 the Süddeutsche Zeitung described Falke as the last large hosiery manufacturer in Germany. Of about 150 German hosiery makers in the 1970s, only a handful remained, and a pair of Falke socks cost on average more than five times the German average price for a pair. In 2019 The Daily Telegraph reported that the Schmallenberg plant had about 150 knitting machines, including 60-year-old machines from Leicester used for the most expensive tights. In 2014 Falke sold a limited run of ten pairs of vicuña-wool socks at £495 a pair; a reviewer for The Guardian found them less soft than expected for the price.
