= Alfred Jensen =

American painter

- Born: December 11, 1903; Guatemala City, Guatemala
- Died: April 4, 1981 (aged 77); Livingston, New Jersey
- Education: Hans Hofmann Munich, Academie Scandinave Paris, Charles Dufresne, Othon Friesz, Charles Despiau
- Notable work: Great Pyramid, 1979, a twelve-panel masterpiece
- Movement: Abstract art
- Spouse: Regina Bogat
- Patrons: Saidie May
- Website: www.alfredjensen.com

Alfred Julio Jensen (11 December 1903 – 4 April 1981) was an abstract painter. His paintings are often characterized by grids of brightly colored triangles, circles or squares, painted in thick impasto. Conveying a complex web of ideas, often incorporating calligraphy or numerical systems, they are frequently referred to as "concrete" abstract art. After his death in 1981, the Guggenheim organized a major retrospective of his work, having held his solo exhibition there in 1961.

== Biography ==
Alfred Jensen was born in Guatemala City, Guatemala, on December 11, 1903. His father Peter was a Danish entrepreneur, and his mother Anna a German-Polish governess working for a French family. Upon his mother's death in 1910, the seven-year-old was sent to Hørsholm, Denmark, to live with his uncle. After graduating from elementary school in Denmark in 1917, Jensen traveled extensively working as a ship's cabin boy—drawing portraits of the passengers and crew. Between 1921 and 1923, he worked as a cowboy and chicken farmer between San Diego and then Guatemala, before returning to San Diego. There he worked as a lumber salesman, while attending San Diego High School at night and then receiving a scholarship to the San Diego Fine Arts School at Balboa Park.

In 1926, he traveled to Munich, Germany, to study under Hans Hofmann, an abstract expressionist painter who trained numerous well-known artists at his schools in Germany and the United States. There he met fellow student Saidie Adler May, a wealthy art collector. For the next 34 years, she was a patron of his work, and he accompanied her in extensive travels, together studying the masters throughout Europe and collecting works by artists such as Paul Klee, Wassily Kandinsky, Theo van Doesburg, William Baziotes, Jackson Pollock, Robert Motherwell, Naum Gabo and Fritz Glarner. In 1951, upon her death, the collection was divided among the Baltimore Museum of Art, San Diego Museum of Art and the Museum of Modern Art in New York.

In 1929, he moved to Paris to study at the Academie Scandinave, learning modern sculpture under Charles Despiau, and painting under Othon Friesz and Charles Dufresne, who becomes Jensen's "spiritual and painter-father."

He moved to the US in 1934, continuing to travel and study with Saidie May, while advising her collecting. Around 1945, he began his 20-year study of Goethe's Zür Farbenlehre, the poet's views on the nature of colours and how they are perceived by humans—considered an origination of Color Theory. In 1951, he settled in New York, opening a studio in the Lincoln Arcade, and began to paint in an abstract expressionist style.

Throughout his life, Jensen met and collaborated with many already or subsequently influential artists, most notably Mark Rothko, Sam Francis, Jean Dubuffet, Joan Miró, and Allan Kaprow, and held exhibitions with contemporaries including Ulfert Wilke, Robert Becker, Sally Hazelet, Franz Kline, Joseph Cornell, Willem de Kooning and Robert Rauschenberg. A well traveled citizen of the world, he spoke five languages and similarly refused to settle into any one artistic movement, remaining a challenge to categorize—as noted by Peter Schjeldahl in his essay "Jensen’s Difficulty".

In 1963, at the age of 60, he married fellow abstract painter Regina Bogat. They traveled and painted together for six months in Italy, Egypt, Greece, France and Switzerland, then had a daughter, Anna in 1965, and son Peter in 1970, finally moving to Glen Ridge, New Jersey, in 1972. Alfred Jensen died on April 4, 1981, in Livingston, New Jersey.

== Works ==
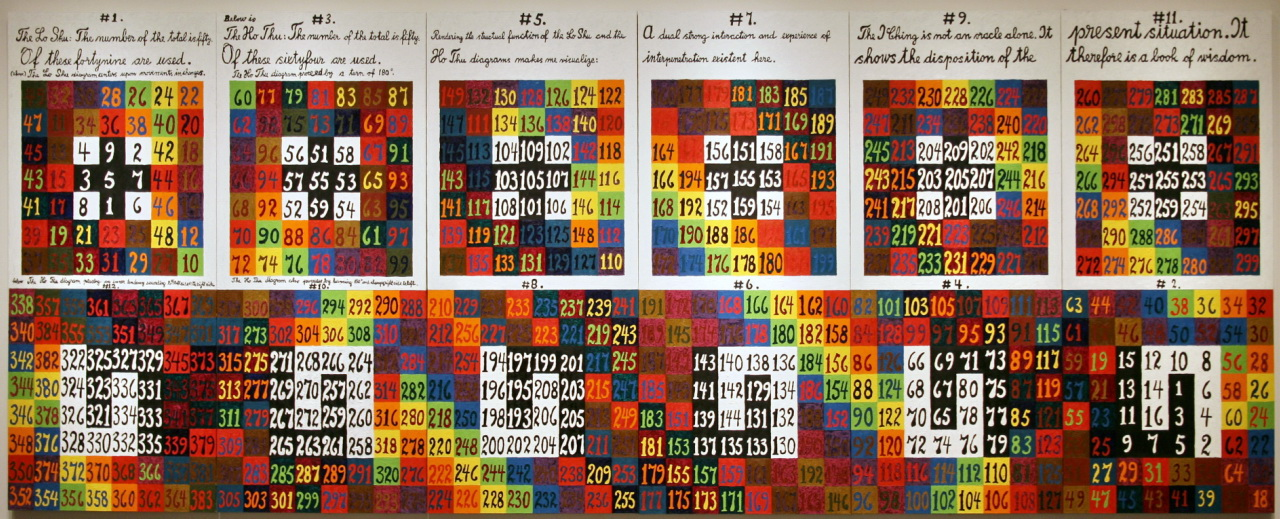
Twelve Events in a Dual Universe, 1978, oil on canvas

Upon the death of Saidie May in 1951, Jensen settled in New York and began to focus exclusively on painting, out of his Lincoln Arcade studio. Here he first gained the attention of James Johnson Sweeney, director of the Guggenheim Museum. His first solo exhibition of twelve canvases was held in 1952 at the John Heller Gallery, including portraits, still life, landscapes and figures in an abstract expressionist style, influenced by his studies of Goethe's color theory, with a palette of prismatic colors. Around this time, he began what would be long friendships with painter Mark Rothko and art critic Lil Picard. This was followed by his first solo show at the Tanager Gallery in 1955, the same year he began to exchange ideas with Sam Francis. In 1957, he started to incorporate checkerboards in his prismatic colored murals, and in diagrams and paintings on paper. He also began to investigate his compositional logic, including calligraphy, and became extremely prolific. Henry Luce III, son of the founder of Time magazine, first collected his work, eventually commissioning a mural for the Time/Life building in Paris in 1959.

Around 1960 Jensen read Maya Hieroglyphic Writing, by J. Eric S. Thompson, which linked to his childhood in Guatemala, and would prove to be a theme in much of his subsequent work. In 1961 he was the subject of a major solo show at the Guggenheim Museum, and his work was included in important group and solo exhibitions in the United States, Switzerland and Germany. By 1963, his work begins "superimposing figurative elements of prismatic colors on checkerboards of black and white or, reversely, figurative elements in black and white against a prismatic colored checkerboard."

For much of the mid to late 1960s, he traveled nearly continuously, notably becoming inspired by ancient Greek architecture, resulting in A Pythagorean Notebook, incorporating Pythagorean number series on top of grid structures, and developed an interest in astronomy, physics and Chinese history (notably the I Ching) - all of which would influence his next several years of work. Beginning with the Pythagorean lithographs, he was one of a number of artists in the 1960s working with serial images.

By the mid 1970s, he became interested in ancient number systems, magnetism and planetary effects on seasons, which became themes of his subsequent paintings.

== Exhibitions and collections ==
Honor Pythagoras, Per I-Per VI (1964), Smithsonian American Art Museum

During his life, a museum retrospective of Jensen's work was organized by the Albright–Knox Art Gallery in Buffalo, New York, and traveled to five other American museums in 1978, concluding at the San Francisco Museum of Modern Art.

"The retrospective was especially welcome for the way it let us see how all themes, all systems, are foreshadowed and aftshadowed, interlinked in unlooked-for ways with other systems, treated from different angles and in different graphic formats from work to work across the 20 years the show encompassed." -Peter Perrin, Arts Canada.

Museum exhibitions after his death include major retrospectives by:

- The Solomon R. Guggenheim Museum in New York in 1985

"(This show) is devoted to an artist whose following is only beginning to emerge and whose true importance for twentieth-century painting seems to us to be no more than foreshadowed." -Thomas M. Messer, Director, Solomon R. Guggenheim Foundation

- The Dia Center for the Arts in 2001-2002

"Jensen's highly respected but rarely seen paintings elaborate his comsological theories, drawing on the sciences of astronomy, physics, and mathematics, and frequently involving Mayan and Chinese calendrical systems. Included are large-scale multi-part paintings that span the artist's mature career beginning in 1960. Among the highlights of the exhibition is Great Pyramid (1980), a key late work never before exhibited publicly."

- The Santa Monica Museum of Art in 2003

"Active since the early 1950s, Jensen discovered his mature artistic voice in 1960, after repudiating abstract expressionist form and color in favor of an art based exclusively on the diagram. In such key works as Cycle Ending, Per I-V (1960) and Parthenon (1962), Jensen developed the parameters of a vision that would define his work over the next twenty years: signs from Mayan calendrical and numerical systems, palette from Goethian color theory, and patterns echoing Guatemala’s landscape, architecture, and textiles." -from the exhibition overview

His work is held in numerous public collections including the Museum of Modern Art, Albright-Knox Art Gallery, Aldrich Contemporary Art Museum, Art Gallery of Western Australia, Baltimore Museum of Art, Dallas Museum of Art, Dia Center for the Arts, the Governor Nelson A. Rockefeller Empire State Plaza Art Collection in Albany, New York, Solomon R. Guggenheim Museum, Hirshhorn Museum and Sculpture Garden, Los Angeles County Museum of Art, Louisiana Museum of Modern Art, National Gallery of Art, San Francisco Museum of Modern Art, Smithsonian Institution and Whitney Museum of American Art.

The Alfred Jensen Estate is represented by the Pace Gallery, New York.
