= Vidalia Mills =

Denim mill in Louisiana, United States

Vidalia Mills in Vidalia, Louisiana was a “farm-to-yarn” denim mill. On April 9, 2025 the Concordia County Sheriff’s Department auctioned off its assets, including land, buildings, and equipment, to cover approximately $32.5 million in debt. Vidalia's Draper X3 shuttle looms had been acquired from the now-closed White Oak Mill in Greensboro, North Carolina. It takes about two hours for Draper loom machines to weave enough fabric for one pair of jeans.

Vidalia Mills took over the old Fruit of the Loom Mill. Vidalia Mills are in Partnership with BASF Agriculture Services producing denim using e3, certified sustainable American cotton. The mill can trace the source of its denim back to the farm the cotton was grown on. The Denim is woven on Vidalia's Draper X3 selvedge denim looms include 45 machines which were acquired from the Cone White Oak Plant in Greensboro, North Carolina.

== See also ==
- Better Cotton Initiative
