= Saidie May =

American art collector (1879–1951)

- Born: Saidie Adler; February 1879; Baltimore, Maryland, United States
- Died: May 28, 1951 (aged 72); New York City, New York, United States
- Other name: Saidie Adler Lehman
- Education: Académie Scandinave
- Spouse(s): Albert Carl Lehman (m. 1902; divorced), Herbert L. May (m. 1922; divorced)
- Children: 1

Saidie Adler May (née Saidie Adler; 1879 – 1951) was an American art collector, of Surrealist and early Abstract Expressionist art. She was a major benefactor to the Baltimore Museum of Art, the San Diego Museum of Art and the Museum of Modern Art in New York City. She was also known as Saidie Adler Lehman.

== Biography ==
Saidie Adler was born in Baltimore in February 1879. Her father, Charles Adler, a wealthy shoe manufacturer who had emigrated from Germany to the United States in 1856, built a home in Bolton Hill and sent his three youngest children to attend private school.

May’s early adult life centered on marriage and domesticity. In 1902, she married Albert Carl Lehman of Pittsburg and gave birth to her son Murray in 1906. She divorced Lehman and married Herbert L. May on October 3, 1922, but this marriage ended in divorce as well.

May preferred a life of independence and art rather than the traditional role of mother and wife. She had the opportunity to travel to Europe in 1924, where she met the artists Hans Hofmann and Alfred Julio Jensen, which had a significant impact on her artistic tastes. She studied art at Académie Scandinave in Paris, under Othon Friesz.

In about 1929, she took the artist Michael Loew with her on a worldwide tour, spending two years in Paris, Africa, Germany, and Italy, and that trip is credited with vastly growing Loew's sophistication and worldview. Cousins to the Cone sisters, Etta and Claribel, famous for their patronage of the Impressionists, May and her sister Blanche Adler also extensively collected. May was also an artist, always learning new techniques and trying different forms, but she was cognizant enough of her talent to realize it was not equivalent to that of the artists she patronized.

In 1933, May closed her Park Lane apartment in Manhattan where she had lived in the 1920s and early 1930s, and gave much of the art and furnishings to the Baltimore Museum of Art. Seven years later, Saidie A. May made the significant contribution of the Renaissance Room bought from William Randolph Hearst complete with the sculpture of St. Catherine of Alexandria and Giovannidal Ponté’s “St, Anthoney’s Abbot” to her beloved museum.

When Blanche died in 1941, May began to focus on amassing more modern works. She has been described as "particularly adventurous" in her tastes. She helped André Masson and his family escape Nazi-occupied France in 1941 and ultimately became a significant collector of his art. May also acquired early pieces of work by Jackson Pollock and Robert Motherwell (later to become important Abstract Expressionists), namely Pollock's "Water Birds" (1943) and Baziotes' The Drugged Balloonist (1942-43). In 1950, Saidie May bestowed the Baltimore Museum of Art $300,000 for a wing dedicated to children, which included an auditorium, gallery, library, staff rooms, and a conference room.

May died on May 28, 1951, in New York City.

== See also ==
- Paysage bord de Seine
