= Cone sisters =

American art collectors

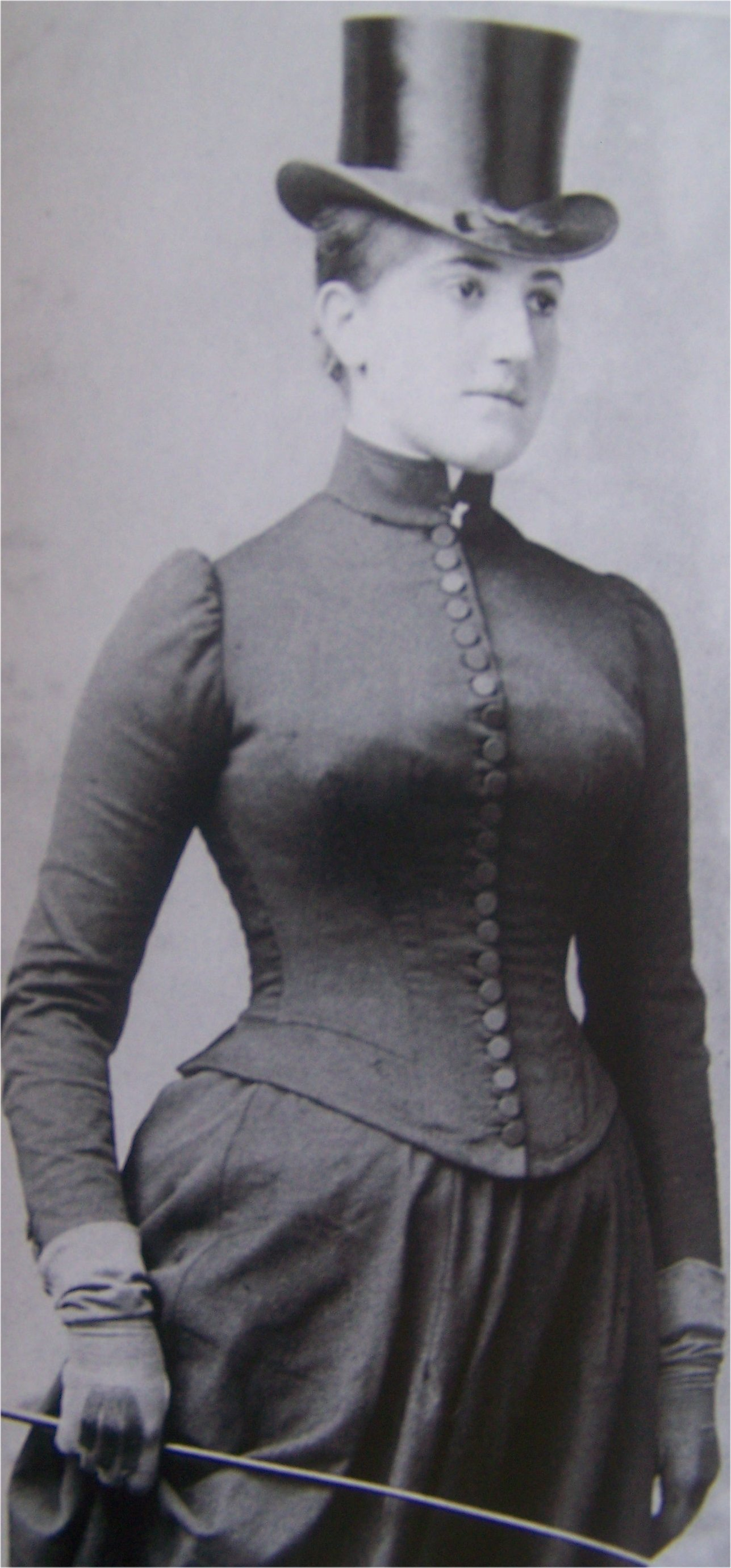
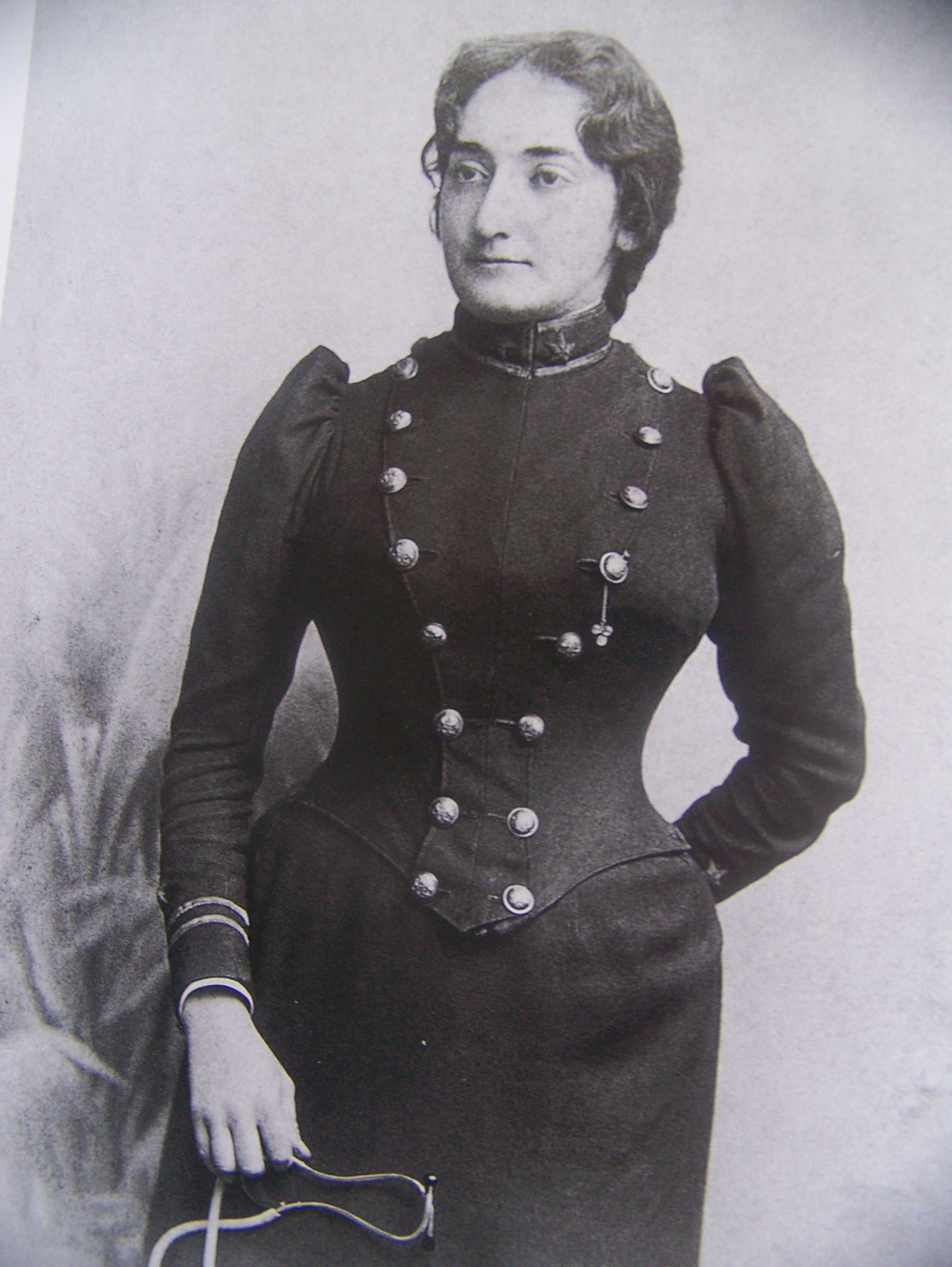
- Etta Cone c. 1889 Claribel Cone c. 1891
- Born: Claribel – November 14, 1864, Etta – November 30, 1870; Jonesboro, Tennessee
- Died: Claribel – September 20, 1929 (aged 64), Etta – August 31, 1949 (aged 78); Baltimore, Maryland
- Resting place: Druid Ridge Cemetery
- Education: Western Female High School; Women's Medical College (Claribel)
- Occupations: Art collectors Physician/researcher (Claribel)
- Parent(s): Herman (Kahn) Cone; Helen (Guggenheimer) Cone

Claribel Cone (1864–1929) and Etta Cone (1870–1949), collectively known as the Cone sisters, were active as American art collectors and socialites during the first part of the 20th century. Claribel trained as a physician and Etta as a pianist. Their social circle included Henri Matisse, Pablo Picasso and Gertrude Stein. They gathered one of the best known private collections of modern art in the United States at their Baltimore apartments, and the collection now makes up a wing of the Baltimore Museum of Art. Their collection was estimated to be worth almost a billion US dollars in 2002.

== Early life ==
The Cones' parents were Herman (Kahn) Cone and Helen (Guggenheimer) Cone, who were German-Jewish immigrants. Herman, who had immigrated from Altenstadt in Bavaria, anglicized his last name (changing it from "Kahn" to "Cone") almost immediately upon arrival in the United States in 1845. Until 1871, the family lived in Jonesboro, Tennessee, where they had a successful grocery business. Claribel and Etta were born in Tennessee. Claribel, the fifth child in the family of thirteen children, was born November 14, 1864. Etta, the ninth child in the family, was born November 30, 1870. The Cone family had a history of slave ownership. Their father Herman and his brother-in-law Jacob Alder purchased three enslaved people in 1863.

The family then moved to Baltimore, Maryland. The eldest Cone brothers, Moses and Ceasar, later moved permanently to Greensboro, North Carolina. They established a textile manufacturing business named the Proximity Manufacturing Company (later known as Cone Mills Corporation, now a unit of International Textile Group). The textile mills that their brothers started would make the Cone sisters wealthy, as Moses and Ceasar shared in their financial success with their siblings.

The Cone sisters graduated from the Western Female High School. Against family wishes, Claribel studied at the Women's Medical College of Baltimore. She graduated in 1890 and completed an internship at Blockley Hospital for the Insane in Philadelphia. She then worked in the pathology laboratory of the Johns Hopkins Medical School and did postgraduate work at the University of Pennsylvania with the ambition of becoming a medical doctor, but ultimately never practiced clinical medicine. Claribel focused instead on teaching and research as a professor of pathology for 25 years at the Women's Medical College. Etta was a pianist and managed the family household affairs. The sisters traveled to Europe together yearly on long trips beginning in 1901.

== Art collecting and connections ==
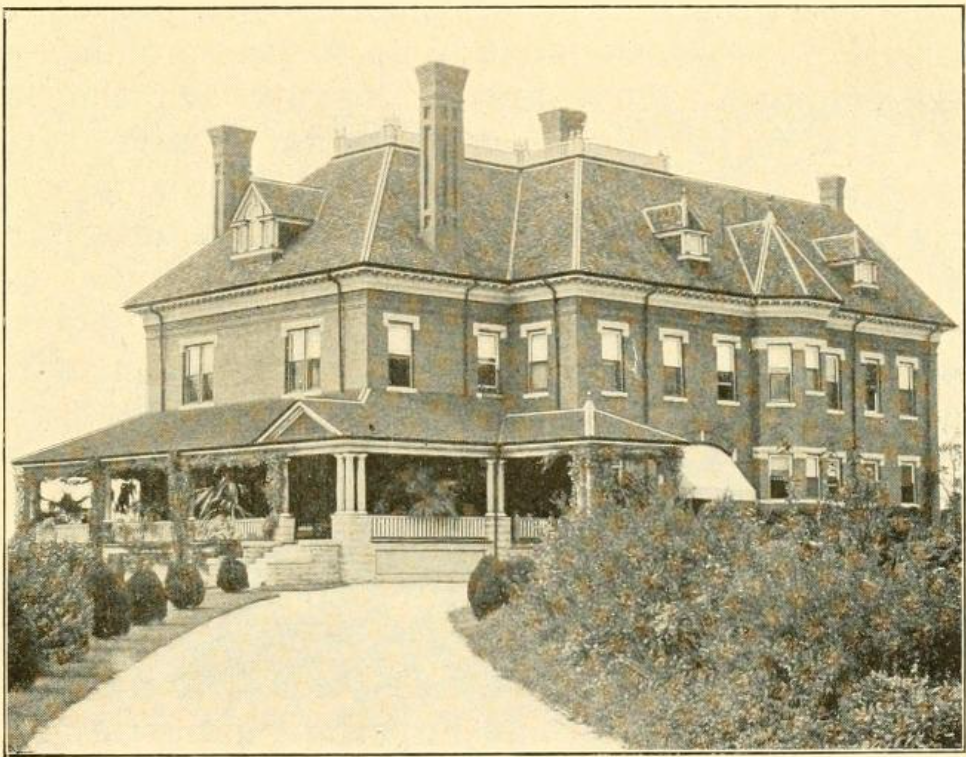
Caesar Cone's residence in Greensboro, North Carolina, c. 1903

The Cone sisters were friends of literary figures such as Gertrude Stein and Alice B. Toklas. Their social circle included French artist Henri Matisse and Spanish painter Pablo Picasso. Etta began purchasing art in 1898, when she was given $300 by a brother to decorate the family home. Her purchase of five impressionistic paintings by Theodore Robinson began a lifetime of collecting. Her tastes at first tended toward the conservative, but one day in 1903, while the Cone sisters were on a European holiday, they visited Stein and her brother in Paris. Etta was introduced to Picasso, followed by Matisse the next year, marking the beginning of her lifelong love of his art. The relationship the Cone sisters developed with Matisse was so close he referred to them as "my two Baltimore ladies." Matisse once did a sketch of Etta.

Etta made purchases to help upcoming artists like Matisse, Picasso, and students of the Maryland Institute College (MICA). She also bought at very low prices from the Steins, who were perpetually in need of money and were known to purchase discarded sketches from Picasso at his art studio for two or three dollars apiece. Claribel acquired much more experimental grade works. She purchased Matisse's Blue Nude for 120,760 francs and Paul Cézanne's mountain painting Mont Sainte Victoire as Seen From Bibemus Quarry for 410,000 francs. Etta, being more financially conservative, was more likely to spend 10,000 francs for a collection of drawings or paintings. The Cone sisters had a special interest in Matisse's Nice period. After Claribel's death, Etta became more adventurous in her purchases, for instance, purchasing Matisse's Large Reclining Nude (The Pink Nude) for 9,000 francs in 1936, or about $2,000 US at the time (equivalent to $36,849 in 2019).

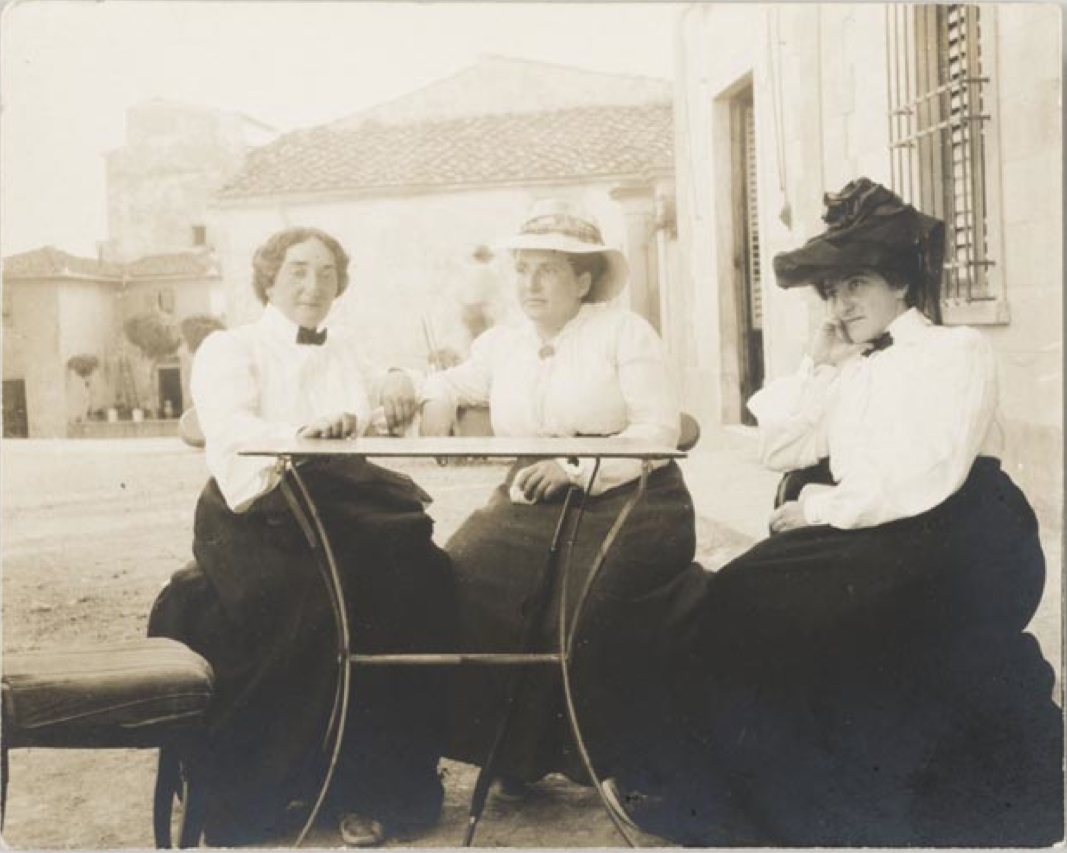
Cone sisters with Gertrude Stein, 1903

Gertrude Stein and her older brother Leo Stein had been orphaned in 1892 and relocated to Baltimore to reside with their mother's sister. This had led to their becoming part of the Cone sisters' social crowd. During Claribel's time at the Women's Medical College of Johns Hopkins University, Gertrude was also studying there. There were many differences between Claribel and Gertrude. These individualistic women were attracted to each other, however, by their common interest in music, fine arts, and sociable conversations. Etta credited Leo Stein with helping her develop an appreciation of modern art. Etta was more reserved. She admired Gertrude's Bohemian lifestyle, and biographer Brenda Richardson concludes that there is a strong possibility Etta and Gertrude were at one point lovers.

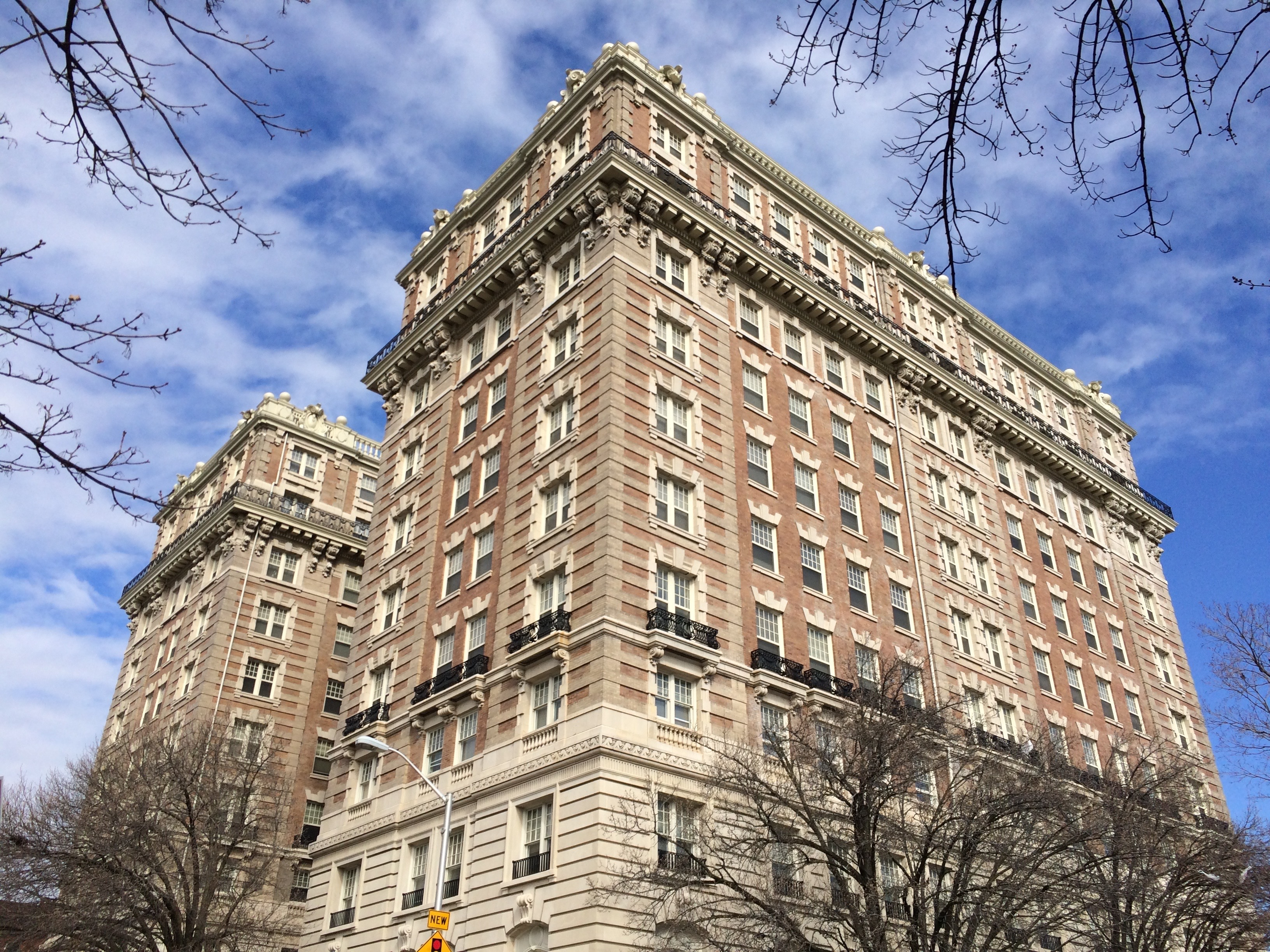
Marlborough Apartments, where the Cone sisters lived in Baltimore on Eutaw Street

The sisters' particular social contacts produced an advantage from which they could compile a world-renowned art collection. The Cone sisters built up a large collection of paintings and sculptures by Picasso, Matisse, Cézanne, Paul Gauguin and Vincent van Gogh.

Gertrude Stein later tried to undermine the Cone sisters as mere shoppers guided by their taste. In fact, the sisters had an excellent feel for fine art, influenced by the large collection of books on art which they purchased and used. The two sisters lived in apartments next to each other at the Marlborough Apartment building on Eutaw Street in the Bolton Hill neighborhood of Baltimore for fifty years. Their art was hung on the walls of their individual apartments. The sisters' nephew later recollected that their display of pictures covered most of the wall space, even the bathroom walls.

The Cone sisters also had an impressive collection of lace acquired from various European sources. From early drawnwork styles such as reticella, to needle lace and bobbin lace styles spanning the centuries, the Cone sisters amassed important examples that also reside in the Baltimore Museum of Art today and have been exhibited. Examples of the Cone lace pieces include a Chantilly lace fan, a Point de France flounce, and many other styles.

== Museum legacies ==
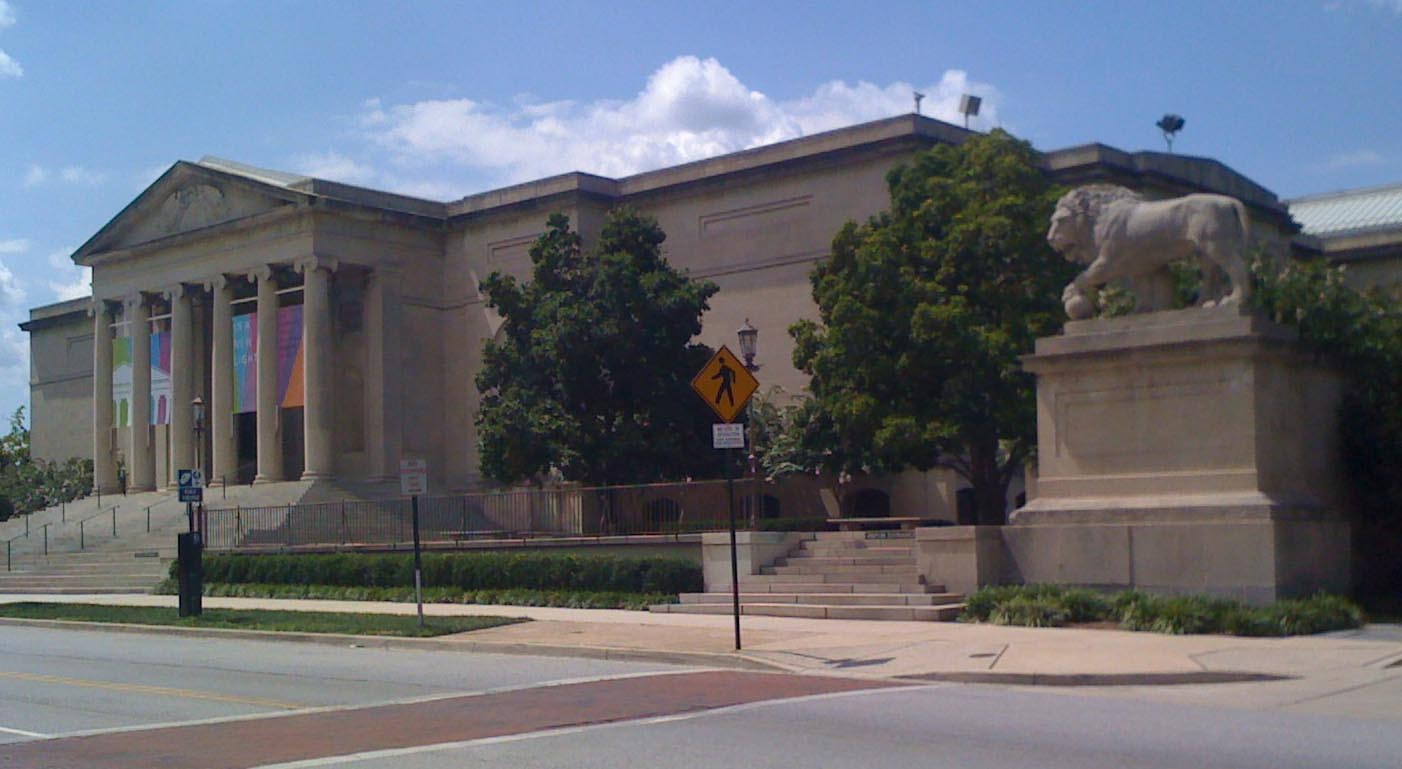
Baltimore Museum of Art

While the sisters' collection remained private until Etta's death, Etta occasionally lent pieces to museums for exhibition. Claribel had willed her artistic paintings to Etta, spelling out in her will that these paintings should be transferred to the Baltimore Museum of Art if there was an interest in modern art. The bulk of the collection eventually went to that museum by Etta's will, and a new wing was added to the museum for the Cone Collection in 1957. The collection consists of approximately 3,000 items the Cone sisters had acquired over 50 years. The collection has not only French art, but American art as well, including over 1000 American prints, illustrated books, and drawings. Among these were cloth goods, costume jewelry, tables, chairs, and cabinets. The Cone sisters' items also include Coptic fragments, Middle Eastern silks, eighteenth-century jewelry, nineteenth-century furniture, oriental rugs, African adornment, Japanese prints, Egyptian sculpture, and antique ivory carvings. The Cone Collection is used by art students and scholars from around the world as a research source. The estimated value of the Cone Collection in 2002 was close to $1 billion.

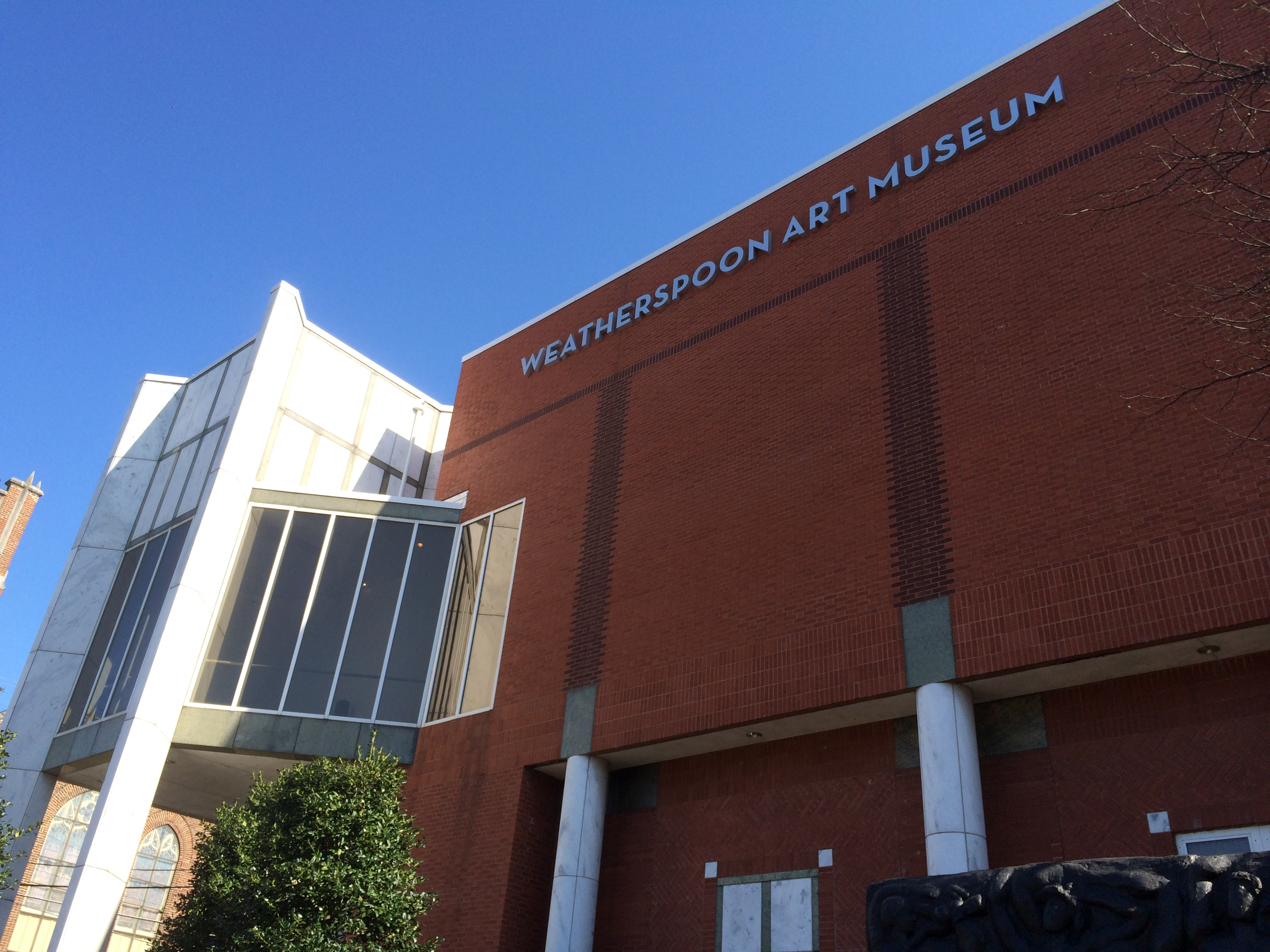
Weatherspoon Art Museum

The Cone Collection includes Matisse's Blue Nude (1907) and Reclining Nude (1935), Cézanne's Mont Sainte Victoire as seen from Bibémus Quarry (1897), Gauguin's Woman of Mango (1892), and Picasso's Mother with Child (1922). The Cone sisters collected pieces from throughout Matisse's painting career, accumulating 42 of his oil paintings, 16 sculptures, 35 drawings, 150 prints, and a half dozen books of illustration, as well as over 200 hand drawings, art prints, and illustrated copper plates from Matisse's first published book of illustration, Poésies de Stéphane Mallarmé. Other Matisse works they acquired were the 1917 Woman in a Turban (Lorette), Seated Odalisque, Knee Bent, Ornamental Background (1928), and Interior, Flowers with Parakeets (1924). The 500 works by Matisse in the Cone sisters' collection form the largest and most representative group of his art work in the world.

The Cone sisters also acquired many of Picasso's works, and among these were 114 prints and drawings from his early years in Barcelona and from his Rose period (1905–1906) in Paris.

A portion of the Cone art collection, including many Matisse lithographs and bronzes, resides at the Weatherspoon Art Museum at the University of North Carolina, where the Cone Mills were located. Moses Cone's vacation home Flat Top Manor was located in nearby Blowing Rock, North Carolina, and the Cone sisters often visited their brother there. Other visitors included Julius Cone – another of the Cone siblings – and his wife Laura, who was an alumnus of the University of North Carolina. Laura was aware that the Weatherspoon Art Gallery had been formed on the campus in 1942, and she asked Etta if she would be interested in making a gift of art. In her will, Etta left an endowment to the Weatherspoon Art Gallery consisting of sixty-seven Matisse prints, six Matisse bronzes, several modern prints, and art by Picasso, Félix Vallotton, Raoul Dufy, and John D. Graham.

== Death ==
Claribel died September 20, 1929. Etta died on August 31, 1949. The Cone sisters were buried at Baltimore's Druid Ridge Cemetery in an area called Hickory Knoll. The only word on their ten-by-ten family mausoleum is "Cone". Architect James O. Olney designed the Tennessee marble mausoleum, which is flanked by two Roman-style columns of Vermont granite and has two age-darkened bronze doors in front.

== Sources ==
- Aichele, K. Porter (2016). Modern Art on Display. University of Delaware Press. ISBN 9781611496178.
- Fillion, Susan (2011). Miss Etta and Dr. Claribel. Boston, Massachusetts: David R. Godine. ISBN 9781567924343.
- Gabriel, Mary (2002). Art of Acquiring: The Portrait of Etta & Claribel Cone. Baltimore, Maryland: Bancroft Press. ISBN 9781890862732.
- Hirschland, Ellan B. (2008). The Cone Sisters of Baltimore. Chicago, Illinois: Northwestern University Press. ISBN 9780810124813.
- Pollack, Barbara (1962). Collectors: Dr. Claribel & Miss Etta Cone. Indianapolis, Indiana: Bobbs-Merrill Company. OCLC 186870265.
- Richardson, Brenda (1985). Dr. Claribel and Miss Etta. Baltimore, Maryland: Baltimore Museum of Art. ISBN 0912298588.
- Shivers, Frank R. (1998). Maryland Wits and Baltimore Bards. Baltimore, Maryland: Johns Hopkins University Press. ISBN 9780801858109.
