= Alfred Robert Louis Dohme =

American druggist (1867–1952)

Alfred Robert Louis Dohme (February 15, 1867-1952) was a prominent druggist in the United States. He was a patron of the arts and a civic leader. He founded the Baltimore Museum of Art. He established a laboratory for the assay of medicinal drugs. He supported home rule and a city charter for Baltimore.

His grandfather was from Germany and was in the brownstone business. He settled in Baltimore with his family.

A.R.L. attended Friends School in Baltimore and graduated from Johns Hopkins University where he became a lecturer. He purchased Chestnutwood outside Roland Park in 1906 from Secretary of the Navy Charles J. Bonaparte. In 1908 he became the first president of the Roland Park Country School.

He was president of Sharp & Dohme. The firm acquired H. K. Mulford of Philadelphia and laid off employees. He was a Republican.

After his first wife died he remarried. He had several daughters.

He gave a lecture on Therapeutics to the American Pharmaceutical Association in 1912. He wrote The Brotherhood Of Man: An Appeal To The Nations published in 1920.

A photographic portrait of him was taken in 1923.

The Baltimore Museum of Art has a letter Dohme wrote related to the museum's founding and building site.
