= J. Spencer Love =

American industrialist (1896-1962)

- J. Spencer Love, 1959
- Born: James Spencer Love; July 6, 1896; Cambridge, Massachusetts, U.S.
- Died: January 20, 1962 (aged 65); Palm Beach, Florida, U.S.
- Resting place: Forest Lawn Cemetery, Greensboro, North Carolina, U.S.
- Education: Cambridge Latin School
- Alma mater: Harvard College (AB); Harvard Business School (MA)
- Occupation: Industrialist
- Known for: Founding and leading Burlington Industries
- Spouses: Sara Elizabeth Love (m. 1922; div. 1940) Martha Eskridge (m. 1944)
- Children: 8

James Spencer Love, also known as J. Spencer Love (July 6, 1896 - January 20, 1962), was an American industrialist, textile manufacturer and president of chairman of Burlington Industries, the largest textile company worldwide with assets of nearly $607 million and over 62,000 employees in 1962. The Martha & Spencer Love School of Business at Elon University bears his name.

== Biography ==
Love was born July 6, 1896, in Cambridge, Massachusetts to James Lee Love and Julia (née Spencer) Love. His paternal grandfather Robert Galvin Grier Love was originally from Gastonia, North Carolina and was co-owner of the Gastonia Cotton Manufacturing Company founded in 1887. His great grandfather, Andrew Love, was also a wealthy slaveholder.

The family lived in Cambridge because Love's father taught mathematics there. His maternal family had strong ties to the University of North Carolina; his maternal grandfather being Professor James Munroe Spencer and his grandmother was Cornelia Phillips Spencer. Love attended the Cambridge Latin School, received a Bachelor of Arts from Harvard College in three years and continued to attend Harvard Business School for another year.

After completing his degree in 1917, Love served in France during World War I on the headquarters staff of the 78th Division, U.S. Infantry. After the war, he relocated to Gaston County, North Carolina, where his relatives were early textile mill owners.

== Career ==
Love founded Burlington Industries in 1923 with support from the Burlington Chamber of Commerce.

== Personal life ==
Love married Sara Elizabeth Love on January 22, 1922, in Davie, North Carolina. They had four sons;

- James Spencer Love, Jr. (born 1926) (m.) Meredith Morgan; seven children
- Robert Lee Love
- Richard Love
- Julian Love

They separated in 1939 and were officially divorced in 1940. He remarried to Martha Eskridge on July 23, 1944, in Cleveland, North Carolina. He had four more children together;

- Charles Eskridge Love (born 1945)
- Martin Eskridge Love (born 1947)
- Cornelia Spencer Love (1949-2020)
- Lela Porter Love (born 1955)

== Death ==
Love died on January 20, 1962, in Palm Beach, Florida aged 65. He previously was a resident of Greensboro, North Carolina. He was buried at Forest Lawn Cemetery in Greensboro, North Carolina.

== Literature ==
- J. Spencer Love; The Spencer Love Story Burlington Industries, 1962
