= Paysage Bords de Seine =

Painting by Pierre-Auguste Renoir

- On the Shore of the Seine (English), Landscape on the Banks of the Seine (English)
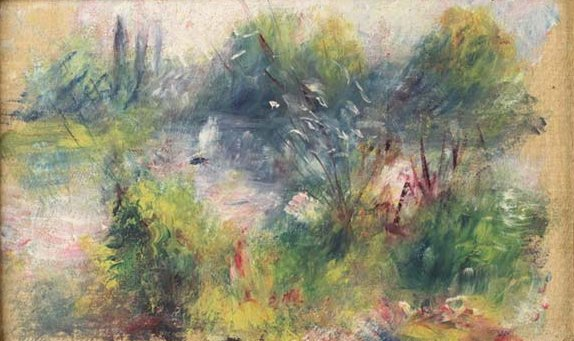
- Artist: Pierre-Auguste Renoir
- Year: 1879
- Type: Oil on linen
- Subject: Landscape of the Seine
- Dimensions: 14 cm × 23 cm (5.5 in × 9 in)
- Owner: Baltimore Museum of Art

Paysage Bords de Seine (On the Shore of the Seine or Landscape on the Banks of the Seine) is an 1879 oil painting by Pierre-Auguste Renoir. It was stolen in 1951 from the Baltimore Museum of Art and resurfaced in 2012.

== History ==
Paysage Bords de Seine was painted by Renoir in 1879. In June 1925, the painting was purchased by the Paris art gallery Bernheim-Jeune from a "Madame Papillon" (possibly Alphonsine Fournaise Papillon, a figure in the artist's Luncheon of the Boating Party). In January 1926, Herbert L. May purchased the painting from Bernheim-Jeune. In 1937, May's ex-wife, Saidie May, loaned the painting to the Baltimore Museum of Art. In her will, Saidie May bequeathed the painting, along with all her other artworks, to the Baltimore Museum of Art. She died on 28 May 1951.

=== Theft and rediscovery ===
Sometime between the evening of 16 November 1951, and a little after noon on 17 November, Paysage Bords de Seine was stolen from the Baltimore Museum of Art during the "From Ingres to Gauguin" show. The museum sold the title of the painting in an insurance claim of $2,500 to Fireman's Fund Insurance Company, which paid the museum for the loss. In July 2012, Marcia Fuqua brought the painting to The Potomack Company auction house in Alexandria, Virginia, to sell. Fuqua claimed that she bought the painting at a flea market in West Virginia for $7 in late 2009, however a family member said the painting had been in the family for "50 or 60 years" (he later changed his account) and other witnesses claimed to have seen the painting in the family's possession decades before the attempted sale. The Potomack Company cancelled the auction scheduled for 29 September 2012, and the Federal Bureau of Investigation seized the painting and opened an investigation into the theft. In November 2013, the Fireman's Fund Insurance Company transferred the title of the painting from the insurance claim back to the Baltimore Museum of Art.

On 10 January 2014, U.S. District Judge Leonie Brinkema ruled that the painting rightfully belongs to the Baltimore Museum of Art. The FBI returned the painting to the museum on 31 January 2014.

=== Return to Baltimore Museum of Art ===
Shortly after regaining possession of the painting, the Baltimore Museum of Art put the artwork on display in an exhibition titled "The Renoir Returns" running from 30 March through 20 July 2014.

== See also ==
- List of paintings by Pierre-Auguste Renoir
- Baltimore Museum of Art Catalogue Entry
