= Michael Loew =

American painter (1907–1985)

- Born: May 8, 1907; New York City, New York, United States
- Died: November 14, 1985 (aged 78); New York City, New York, United States
- Education: Art Students League of New York, Académie Scandinave
- Occupations: Painter, teacher
- Known for: Painting
- Movement: Abstract expressionism, geometric abstraction, hard-edge painting
- Awards: Judith Rothchild Grant, 1997, Guggenheim Memorial Fellowship, National Endowment of the Arts Fellowship Grant

Michael Loew (May 8, 1907 — November 14, 1985) was an American abstract expressionist painter and teacher, who was active in New York City. He taught for many years at the School of Visual Arts (SVA) and University of California, Berkeley (UC Berkeley).

== Career ==
In the late 1920s, Loew studied at the Art Students League of New York with the Ashcan School and was a recipient of a Sadie A. May Fellowship which allowed Loew to continue his studies in France. He studied at Académie Scandinave in Paris.

Michael worked for New Deal art projects from 1933 to 1937, and during this time painted murals for U.S. post offices, high schools and the Hall of Pharmacy for the 1939 New York World's Fair. Loew chose to share his private commission with close friend and fellow artist, Willem de Kooning.

From 1939 to 1940 Loew traveled to Mexico and the Yucatán, gathering inspiration for his future work. Joining the U.S. Navy Seabees in 1943 as a Battalion Painter, Loew documented the work being done on the airbase on Tinian Island. It was from this airbase that the Enola Gay would later take off from to drop the atomic bombs. Loew captured much of the work done on the island by the Navy in dozens of watercolors.

Returning to New York after the war, having lost much of his hearing, Loew started over with his art studies. He studied with Hans Hofmann at the Hans Hofmann School in New York and Provincetown, and with Fernand Léger at Atelier Leger in Paris. Loew became a member of the American Abstract Artists and The Artist's Club as well as The Spiral Group. His works were shown at the Stable Gallery Annuals of 1951–1955.

In 1960 and again in 1966, Loew was hired to teach at the University of California, Berkeley. He also spent nearly three decades as a teacher at the School of Visual Arts. In 1976 he won a fellowship grant from the National Endowment for the Arts and in 1979 he was awarded a grant from the Guggenheim Foundation.

Over the course of his life, Michael's work was exhibited extensively in galleries, museums and other cultural institutions including: The Solomon R. Guggenheim Museum, The Dallas Museum of Art, The Whitney Museum of American Art, The Philadelphia Museum of Art and The Hirshhorn Museum and Sculpture Garden. The Michael Loew Papers are located in the Archives of American Art at the Smithsonian Institution. His works have been exhibited in galleries including the Anita Shapolsky Gallery in New York City and the Thomas McCormick Gallery.

In 1997 his estate was awarded the Judith Rothschild Foundation Grant.

== Teaching positions ==
- 1958–1985 School of Visual Arts, New York City
- 1960, 1966 University of California, Berkeley

== Awards and fellowships ==
- 1964 Ford Foundation Purchase
- 1976 National Endowment for the Arts Fellowship Grant
- 1979 John Simon Guggenheim Memorial Foundation Fellowship
- 1997 Judith Rothschild Grant

== Collections ==
- Brooklyn Museum
- Buffalo AKG Art Museum
- Carnegie Museums of Pittsburgh
- Dallas Museum of Art
- Detroit Institute of Arts
- Farnsworth Museum
- Fine Arts Museums of San Francisco
- Hampton University
- Hirshhorn Museum and Sculpture Garden
- Israel Museum
- Monhegan Museum of Art & History, Monhegan Island, Maine
- Philadelphia Museum of Art
- Portland Museum of Art
- Smithsonian American Art Museum
- Solomon R. Guggenheim Museum
- Whitney Museum of American Art
- Wichita State University
- University of California, Berkeley
