= Regina Bogat =

American abstract artist

- Born: 1928 (age 97–98); Brooklyn, New York, U.S.
- Movement: Abstract art
- Spouse: Alfred Jensen
- Website: reginabogat.com

Regina Bogat (born 1928) is an American abstract artist currently living and working in New Jersey. Married to artist Alfred Jensen, her own artwork was often overlooked in favor of her husband's, although her work has experienced renewed interest from the art world during the past decade. She is best known for the abstract paintings she made in the 1960s and 1970s using cords, wooden strips, and colorful threads.

== Personal life ==
Bogat was born in Brooklyn, New York and studied at the Art Students League of New York while also attending Brooklyn College. Bogat was a docent at the Whitney for several years. In 1948, Bogat married photographer Louis Dienes, but the pair later divorced. After her divorce, Bogat moved into a studio on the Bowery in lower Manhattan, where she first met Mark Rothko, who had a studio on the same floor. In 1962, Bogat moved her studio to Division Street in Chinatown. After a solo show featuring her work was cancelled, Bogat decided to hang the exhibition in her Chinatown studio, inviting her circle of artist friends to attend. It was at this party where she met Alfred Jensen, 25 years her senior and already an established artist, whom she married in 1963. During this time in New York, she also befriended Elaine de Kooning, Eva Hesse, Ad Reinhardt, Claes Oldenburg, and choreographers Trisha Brown and Yvonne Rainer.

In 1972, Bogat, with her husband and their two children, moved to New Jersey. After moving to New Jersey, she completed her bachelor's degree at Rutgers University.

== Career ==
Bogat has been productive throughout her entire career and continues to make work today. She has exhibited in the United States and in Europe and her work is included in museum collections. She was included in the 1973 exhibition, Women choose Women curated by Lucy Lippard at the New York Cultural Center. In 2014, the Blanton Museum (Austin, TX) acquired a major work Cord Painting 14, 1977. In 2015, Regina Bogat was invited by Sarah Cain to be part of her solo exhibition, SARAH CAIN Blue in your Body, Red when it hits the Air, at the Museum of Contemporary Art, San Diego, CA. In 2017, Karen Wright invited Regina Bogat to participate in Entangled: Threads & Making at the Turner Contemporary, Margate, UK. In 2017, Kelly Baum, a curator of contemporary art at The Metropolitan Museum of Art (NY) included Regina in the major exhibition, Delirious: Art at the Limits of Reason, 1950 – 1980 at the Met Breuer with Cord Painting 15, 1977, a work which had just been acquired by The Metropolitan Museum. In 2017, her work The Phoenix and The Mountain no.2, 1980, was acquired by the Centre Pompidou. In 2019, she was elected as a member of the National Academy of Design.

== Exhibitions ==
- Regina Bogat: Ascension (2005 - 2008), Zürcher Gallery, New York City, 2019
- Postwar Women, Art Students League of NY, New York City, 2019
- Three Americans from New York, Galerie La Forest Divonne, Brussels, 2019
- Delirious: Art at the Limits of Reason, The Metropolitan Museum of Art, New York City, 2018
- Entangled: Threads and Making, Turner Contemporary, Margate, UK, 2018
- Regina Bogat: Bogat in The 90s: The Decade of Deconstruction, Zürcher Gallery, New York City, 2018
- Regina Bogat: Phoenix and the Mountain, 1980 and New Paintings from 2013 – 2015, Galerie Zürcher, Paris, 2016
- East West: Confluences of thinking from Mengei to Modernism and Beyond, Dorsky Curatorial Programs, LIC, NY, 2016
- Regina Bogat: Works from the 70s and 80s, Zürcher Gallery, New York City, 2015
- SARAH CAIN: blue in your body, red when it hits the air, Museum of Contemporary Art San Diego, La Jolla, California, 2015
- Regina Bogat: Work – 1967-1977, Zürcher Gallery, New York City, 2014
- Regina Bogat: The New York Years, 1960-1970, Galerie Zürcher, Paris, 2014
- I was a double, Tang Museum, Saratoga Springs, New York, 2014
- If You’re Accidentally Not Included, Don’t Worry About It, curated by Peter Saul, Zürcher Gallery, New York City, 2014
- Regina Bogat: The New York Years, 1960-1970, Zürcher Gallery, New York City, 2013
- Regina Bogat: Stars Art 101, Brooklyn, NY, 2012
- Vertical: New Paintings by Regina Bogat and Fausto Sevila, Simon Liu Gallery, Brooklyn, New York, 2006
- Regina Bogat, Selected Works, New Jersey State Museum, Trenton, New Jersey, 1994
- Memorial Boxes, Soho 20 Gallery Invitational Space, New York City, 1984
- Regina Bogat: Paintings and Box Constructions, Sid Deutsch, New York City, 1983
- Regina Bogat, Women Artists Series at Douglass College, Mabel Smith Douglass Library, Rutgers, The State University of New Jersey, New Brunswick, 1982
- Regina Bogat: The Phoenix and the Mountain, Wenger Gallery, La Jolla, California, 1980–81
- Women—Self Image, Women's Interart Center, New York City, 1974
- Women Choose Women curated by Lucy Lippard, New York Cultural Center, New York City, 1973
- American Works on Paper, Baden-Baden Museum, Baden-Baden, Germany, 1970
- Collection of Dr. and Mrs. Max Welti, Kunstmuseum, Zurich, Switzerland, 1963
- Regina Bogat, Ferrell Galleries, El Paso, TX, 1962
- ART:USA 58, Madison Square Garden, New York City, 1958-1959
- Regina Bogat: New Paintings, Terrain Gallery, New York City, 1956
