= Baltimore Museum of Art =

Art museum in Maryland, United States

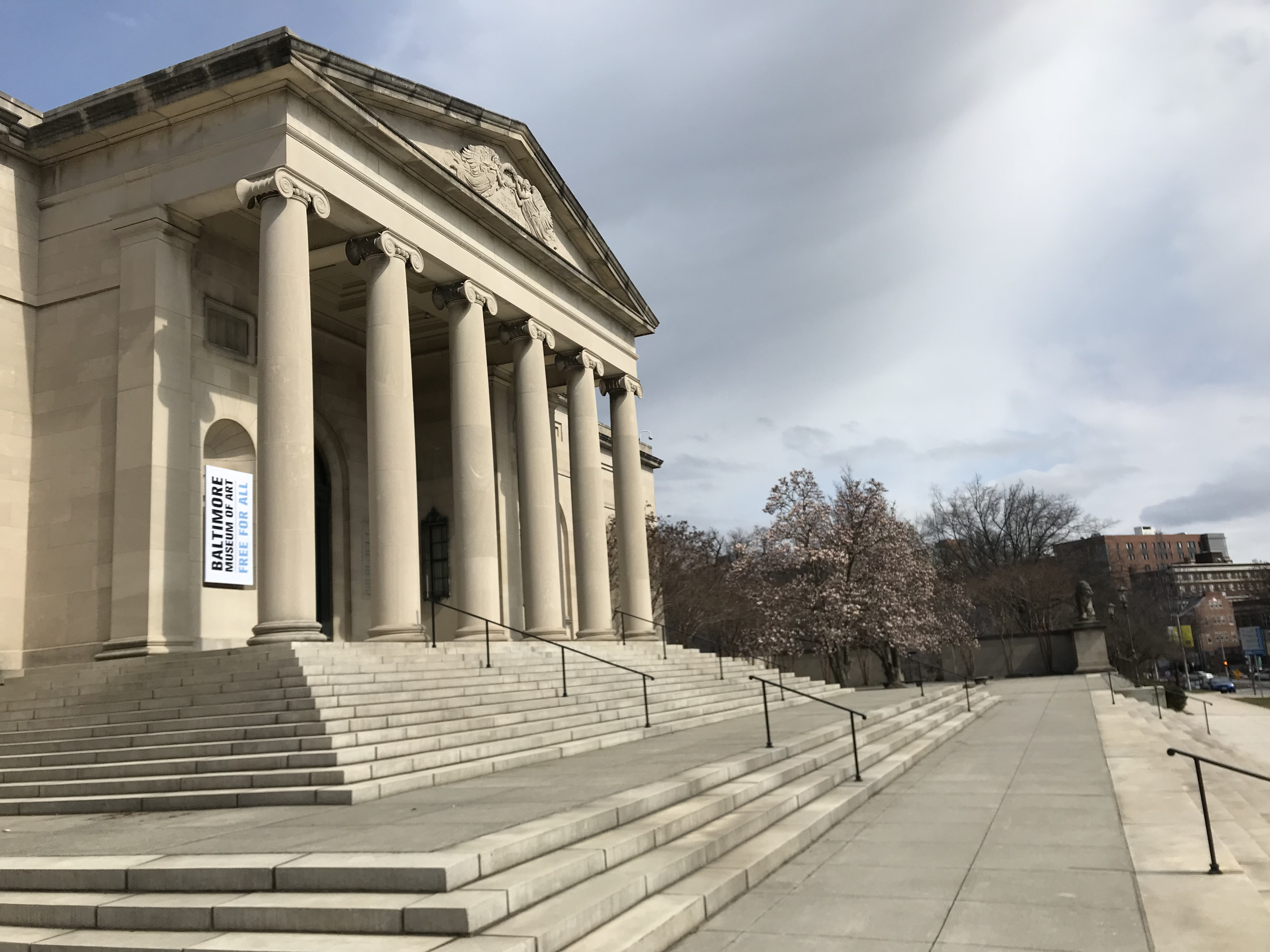
- Baltimore Museum of Art in March 2018
- Interactive fullscreen map
- Established: 1914
- Location: 10 Art Museum Drive; Baltimore, Maryland, 21218, U.S.
- Coordinates: 39°19′34″N 76°37′9″W
- Director: Asma Naeem
- Chairperson: James Thornton
- Public transit access: BaltimoreLink routes Silver, 21, 51, 94, 95; Charm City Circulator Purple Route
- Website: www.artbma.org

Baltimore City Landmark
- Designated: 1987

The Baltimore Museum of Art (BMA) is an art museum in Baltimore, Maryland, United States. Founded in 1914, the BMA's collection of 95,000 objects encompasses more than 1,000 works by Henri Matisse anchored by the Cone Collection of modern art, as well as one of the nation's finest holdings of prints, drawings, and photographs. The galleries currently showcase collections of art from Africa; works by established and emerging contemporary artists; European and American paintings, sculpture, and decorative arts; ancient Antioch mosaics; art from Asia, and textiles from around the world.

The 210,000-square-foot (20,000 m^{2}) museum is distinguished by a neoclassical building designed in the 1920s by American architect John Russell Pope and two landscaped gardens with 20th-century sculpture. The museum is located between Charles Village, to the east, Remington, to the south, Hampden, to the west; and south of the Roland Park neighborhoods, immediately adjacent to the Homewood campus of Johns Hopkins University, though the museum is an independent institution and not affiliated with the university.

The highlight of the museum is the Cone Collection, brought together by Baltimore sisters Claribel and Etta Cone. Accomplished collectors, the sisters amassed a wealth of works by artists including Henri Matisse, Pablo Picasso, Paul Cézanne, Edgar Degas, Paul Gauguin, Vincent van Gogh, and Pierre-Auguste Renoir, nearly all of which were donated to the museum. The museum is also home to 18,000 works of French mid-19th-century art from the George A. Lucas collection, which has been acclaimed by the museum as a cultural "treasure" and "among the greatest single holdings of French art in the country."

The BMA is currently led by Dr. Asma Naeem, who was appointed in January 2023. Naeem is the first person of color and the first person raised in Baltimore to lead the museum. Since October 2006, The Baltimore Museum of Art and the Walters Art Museum have offered free general admission year-round. The museum is also the site of "Gertrude's Chesapeake Kitchen", a popular restaurant owned and operated by chef John Shields.

== History ==
=== 20th century ===
In February 1904, the Great Baltimore Fire destroyed much of the central part of the Baltimore's downtown business district. In response, the municipal government established a city-wide congress to develop a master plan for the city's recovery and future growth and development. The congress, headed by Dr. A. R. L. Dohme, decided that a major deficiency of the city was the lack of an art museum. This decision led to the formation of an 18-person Committee on the Art Museum, with art dealer and industrialist Henry H. Wiegand as chairman. Ten years later, on November 16, 1914, the museum was officially incorporated. Along with Minneapolis and Cleveland, Baltimore's museum was "modeled after two prominent 1870s predecessors, the Metropolitan Museum of Art in New York and the Museum of Fine Arts, Boston". According to a booklet published at the time of incorporation, it was stated that Baltimore lagged behind other cities "in regard to matters of aesthetic interest."

Still without a permanent site, the fledgling museum was founded with but a single painting, William Sergeant Kendall's Mischief, which was donated by Dr. Dohme himself. As the museum's founders were confident that more art would eventually be acquired, the nearby Peabody Institute agreed to hold the collection for a time until a permanent home was established. The committee began planning a permanent home for the museum's holdings.

By 1915, the group had decided to permanently house the museum in the Wyman Park area, west of the Peabody Heights neighborhood, later renamed Charles Village. In 1916, a building was purchased on the southwest corner of North Charles and West Biddle Streets as a possible location for the museum. Although an architect was employed to remodel it, it was never occupied. By 1917, the group had received a promise from Johns Hopkins University for the land further south of the new Georgian Revival architecture-Federal styled campus they were in the process of moving to. This prospective plot was near the old Homewood Mansion of 1800 and the later Italianate style Wyman Villa mansion of William Wyman, a Johns Hopkins University donor and trustee. The group subsequently left the downtown site at North Howard Street and West Centre, which they had occupied since 1876.

Prior to moving to its permanent home in 1929, however, the museum was temporarily moved in July 1922 to the former home of their prime benefactor and foundress, Mary Elizabeth Garrett, at 101 West Monument Street, on the southwest corner with Cathedral Street facing West Mount Vernon Place and the Washington Monument. Garrett, a philanthropist who also further endowed the Johns Hopkins School of Medicine, was the only daughter of John Work Garrett, the Civil War-era President of the Baltimore and Ohio Railroad who supported then President Abraham Lincoln, and was a scion of the Robert Garrett banking firm in the city.

In 1923, the museum's inaugural exhibition opened there with attendance topping 6,775 during its first week. The house was offered by Miss M. Cary as a home for the "collections" and a meeting place for the board of trustees. The old Garrett mansion was acquired in 1925 by the group of art enthusiasts who bought the property for the purpose of keeping the museum intact. Despite having limited space, the museum offered accommodations to art associations and a hall for meetings.

At Wyman Park, architect John Russell Pope was engaged to design the museum's permanent home. With his years of study in Europe, Pope is considered to be the main examplar of the classical revival style that proved so popular with traditional American architects. He is credited with a number of major buildings along the American east coast and abroad, including the National Archives Building in Washington, New York's American Museum of Natural History, and the Tate Gallery Sculpture Hall in London. His distinct brand of classicism, both serene and monolithic, was perhaps the perfect choice for such an ambitious project.

The cornerstone was laid on October 20, 1927, facing the future Art Museum Drive running diagonally from North Charles Street. The systems engineering for the building's original design was completed by Henry Adams, noted local mechanical engineer. The building consists of three floors and includes several rooms that were reconstructed and/or replicated from six local Maryland historic houses before their loss or razing.

The building phase was marked by controversy over its location, cost, and the quality of workmanship, but on April 19, 1929, it opened on schedule without much fanfare. The first visitors were greeted by Rodin's The Thinker in the Sculpture Court, and most of the objects on display were lent by Baltimore and Maryland collectors. An average of 584 visitors attended the museum each day during its first two months.

By the 1930s, the public reception was such that director Roland McKinney, in a letter to board chairman Henry Treide, noted, "People seem to feel that the Museum belongs to them and show that they are sincerely proud of it and its activities." However, these people were mostly upper-crust, privileged, and white, a fact noted in a 1937 Carnegie Corporation report. "[Baltimore] cultural institutions (outside of the library and the schools) have appealed to, been intended for, and been supported by a pretty small minority... they need to be opened up, for the viewpoint of the entire community and its needs", it concluded. Local artists were feeling slighted, as well. "We, the living, resent being left to work in a vacuum of indifference and neglect while so much of the dead past is exhausted [by the BMA]," the president of the Artists' Union of Baltimore complained to The Evening Sun in 1937. The writer of the letter was Morris Louis, whose work, decades later, would be in the BMA's contemporary collection. Treide responded with an extensive community outreach survey and, in 1939, presented the city's first exhibition of African-American art. The show drew over 12,000 visitors in two weeks.

Many of the objects lent to the museum when it opened were eventually donated to it. Among the donors who have shaped the museum's collection are Blanche Adler, Dr. Claribel Cone and Etta Cone, Jacob Epstein, Edward J. Gallagher, Jr., John W. and Robert Garrett, Mary Frick Jacobs, Ryda H. and Robert H. Levi, Saidie Adler May, Dorothy McIlvain Scott, Elsie C. Woodward, and Alan and Janet Wurtzburger. The growing collection is reflected in the three major expansions: the Saidie A. May Wing in 1950, the Woodward Wing in 1956, and the Cone Wing in 1957. These additions were all designed by local architects Wrenn, Lewis and Jencks to harmonize with the original Pope Building.

The museum's collection includes more than 95,000 objects, making it the largest art museum in Maryland. It is governed by a private board of trustees and receives funding from the City of Baltimore, Baltimore, Carroll, and Howard counties; the state of Maryland, various corporations and foundations, federal agencies; individual trustees, and private citizens.

=== 21st century ===
The BMA welcomes more than 200,000 visitors annually. In addition to its art collection, it organizes and hosts traveling exhibitions and serves as a major arts center for the region through its programs.

Between 2012 and 2015, the BMA completed a $28 million renovation that improved galleries for contemporary, American, African, and Asian art collections; improved essential infrastructure, and created more visitor amenities.

The first phase of the BMA's renovation was completed in November 2012 with the reopening of the Contemporary Wing. In November 2014, after being closed for almost 30 years, the neoclassical Merrick Historic Entrance was reopened to the public to coincide with the museum's 100-year anniversary. The next phase encompassed the Dorothy McIlvain Scott American Wing, comprising the first and second floors of the BMA's original 1929 building designed by the acclaimed American architect John Russell Pope; the 1982 East Wing Lobby and Zamoiski East Entrance designed by Bower, Lewis & Thrower; and critically important upgrades to the museum's infrastructure. The architect for this phase of the renovation was the Baltimore-based architecture firm Ziger/Snead, with construction completed by The Whiting-Turner Contracting Company of Towson, Maryland. The project manager was Synthesis, Inc., of Columbia, Maryland. The BMA also greatly expanded galleries for its African and Asian art collections, which opened in April 2015. The culmination of the renovation was the opening of the new $4.5 million, 5,000 sq ft (460 m^{2}) Patricia and Mark Joseph Education Center in October 2015.

The renovation was funded by the museum's philanthropic campaign, In a New Light: The Campaign for The Baltimore Museum of Art, which raised $80.7 million and added more than 4,000 artworks to the collection during the decade leading up to the BMA's 100th anniversary.

In 2018, the BMA announced its intention to sell seven works by artists already well-represented in the collection in order to acquire more contemporary works by women and artists of color. This initiative led to the addition of works by Mark Bradford, Isaac Julian, Wangechi Mutu, Amy Sherald, Carrie Mae Weems, Jack Whitten, Lynette Yiadom-Boakye, and other notable contemporary artists. In fall 2019, the museum transformed the East Lobby with a major new work by artist Mickalene Thomas as part of the Robert E. Meyerhoff and Rheda Becker Biennial Commission. This endowment gift is the first named public art commission in the U.S. and includes a curatorial fellowship to help strengthen the diversity of the museum. The current Meyerhoff-Becker lobby commission by Mexican-American artist Raúl de Nieves debuted in November 2023.

In November 2019, it was announced that the Baltimore Museum of Art would only purchase works made by female artists in 2020. The decision was made in efforts to work towards "re-correcting the canon." Marking the 100th anniversary of the 19th amendment, which gave women the right to vote, all twenty-two exhibitions in 2020 focused on women artists. A controversy arose in October, 2020, over the proposed sale of museum holdings to increase its endowment. Among the artworks slated for auction to raise an estimated $65 million was The Last Supper by Andy Warhol. The ensuing outcry resulted in cancellation of the sale. The Baltimore Sun said the museum was " ... battered by more negative publicity than it has endured in recent memory", which led to criticism of the museum's leadership.

In 2020, John Waters promised to donate 372 pieces from his personal collection, on condition that the museum name an all-gender bathroom after him. The museum also named its rotunda for Waters. The first exhibition of pieces from the donation took place in 2022.

In June 2022, it was reported that AFSCME Council 67 would represent BMA workers, along with those at Walters Art Museum and Enoch Pratt Free Library if unionization efforts were successful at those institutions.

== Collections ==
=== African art ===
The BMA was one of the first museums in the United States to obtain a collection of African art. A large part of the collection was donated by Janet and Alan Wurtzburger in 1954. It contains more than 2,000 objects whose sources range from ancient Egypt to contemporary Zimbabwe, and includes works from many other cultures, including Bamana, Yoruba, Kuba, Ndebele. The collection includes many different forms of art, including headdresses, masks, figures, royal staffs, textiles, jewelry, ceremonial weapons, and pottery. Several of the pieces are known for their use in royal courts, performances, and religious contexts, and many are internationally known.

Highlights of the collection include works by carvers Zlan and Sonzanlwon, and figures by the legendary brasscaster Ldamie. Also on display are a Lozi throne from c. 1900, most likely carved in the court of King Lewanika of western Zambia, a 20th-century Hausa Koranic prayer board, and a 2006 video work by Theo Eshetu. Several of the masks and figurative sculptures are recognized internationally as the best of their type.

=== American art ===
The BMA's American art collection includes paintings, sculptures, and decorative arts spanning from the colonial era to the late 20th century. The museum has several works of art from the Baltimore area, including portraiture by Charles Willson Peale, Rembrandt Peale, and other members of the Peale family; silver from Baltimore's prominent silver manufacturing company Samuel Kirk & Son; Baltimore album quilts; and painted furniture by John Finlay and Hugh Finlay of Baltimore.

The American painting collection at the museum ranges from 18th-century portraits and 19th-century landscape painting to American Impressionism and modernism, with works by artists John Singleton Copley, Thomas Sully, Thomas Eakins, John Singer Sargent, Childe Hassam, and Thomas Hart Benton. Notable canvases include A Wild Scene (1831–1832) by Thomas Cole, La Vachère (1888) by Theodore Robinson, and Pink Tulip (1926) by Georgia O'Keeffe. These are complemented by holdings of prints and drawings, as well as modern photographs from the Gallagher/Dalsheimer Collection. Artists represented include Imogen Cunningham, Man Ray, Paul Strand, and Alfred Stieglitz.

The BMA has a long record of collecting works by African American artists that began in 1939 with one of the first exhibitions of African American art in the country. This collection has grown with the addition of works by 19th- and 20th-century African-American artists Joshua Johnson, Jacob Lawrence, Edmonia Lewis, Horace Pippin, and Henry Ossawa Tanner, as well as numerous works by contemporary artists.

The BMA's holdings of American decorative arts include an extensive furniture collection that represents the major historic cabinetmaking centers of Baltimore, Philadelphia, New York City, and Boston. Many of these objects came from Dorothy McIlvain Scott, a generous Baltimore philanthropist and collector.

A gift in 1933 by Mrs. Miles White, Jr. of over 200 pieces of Maryland silver formed the nucleus of a silver collection that now encompasses objects by leading 18th- and early 19th-century silversmiths in Annapolis and Baltimore, as well as examples of early English silver owned by Maryland families during the Federal era. Among them is the Annapolis Subscription Plate, made by Annapolis silver smith John Inch and the oldest surviving silver object made in Maryland. Later masterworks by artists from Louis Comfort Tiffany to Georg Jensen are also on view.

Other notable aspects of the decorative arts collection include a rare set of five clerestory windows and two mosaic-clad architectural columns that represent Tiffany's contribution to 20th-century ornament. Period rooms from six historic Maryland houses, along with architectural elements from other historic buildings, illustrate town and country building styles from the 18th and 19th centuries, and miniature rooms made by Chicago miniaturist Eugene Kupjack that invite scrutiny of a variety of decorative styles at close range.

=== Antioch mosaics ===
The BMA exhibits a collection of Antioch mosaics, the result of its participation in excavations of this ancient city, known today as Antakya in southeastern Turkey, near the border of Syria.

With the support of BMA Trustee Robert Garrett, the Baltimore Museum of Art joined the Musées Nationaux de France, Worcester Art Museum, and Princeton University during the excavations of 1932 to 1939, discovering 300 mosaic pavements in and around the lost city. The BMA received some of the mosaics from the excavation, totaling 34 pavements, 28 of which are on display in the museum's sunlit atrium court.

Discovered in the affluent suburb of Daphne and the nearby port city of Seleucia Pieria, the mosaics date from the days of the emperor Hadrian in the 2nd century A.D. to the Christian empire of Justinian in the 6th century, bridging the Classical world and the early Middle Ages. The mosaics illustrate how the classical art of Greece and Rome evolved into the art of the early Christian era, and tell the story of how people lived in this ancient city prior to its destruction by catastrophic earthquakes in 526 and 528 A.D. The mosaics are notable for their grand scale and elaborately patterned borders, and the brilliance of their decorative and naturalistic effects.

=== Art of the ancient Americas ===
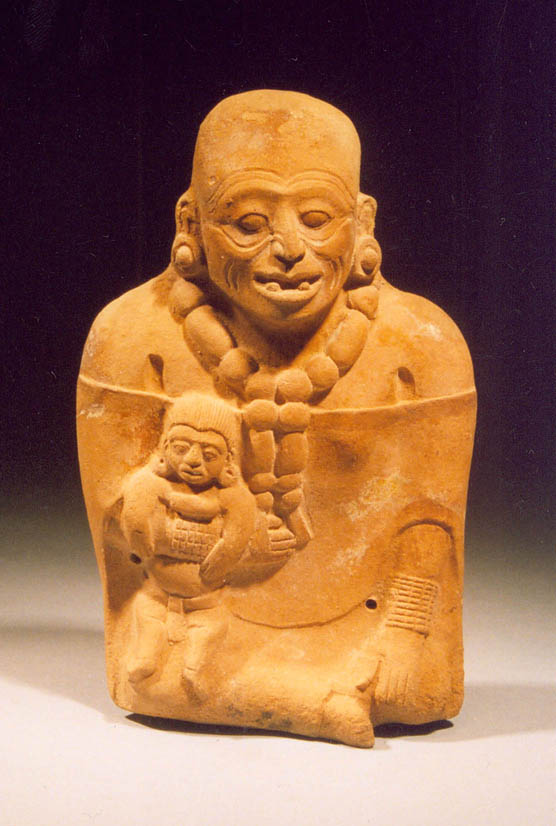
Ancient woman with child, art from the Maya or Jaina dating to the 7th–10th century, at the museum

This collection contains works from 59 distinct artistic traditions from Aztec and Maya of Mesoamerica, Chimú and Muisca of Andean South America, and Nicoya, and the Atlantic Watershed of Costa Rica. The collection includes works from 2500 BC to AD 1521. The core collection of 120 objects was given to the museum by Alan Wurtzburger in 1958, which significantly expanded the scope of the existing collection and provided momentum for a traveling exhibition of Peruvian ceramics titled Myths of Ancient Peru (1969).

The collection is particularly admired for its West Mexico ceramics, including an important Nayarit house model and an enthroned chief. Also on display is a unique assemblage of 23 figures in dance regalia which celebrates ancient performance and highlights the diversity of Colima art.

Other notable pieces include a finely worked serpentine figure of Olmec mastery, elegant portrayals of Maya and Aztec noblewomen showcasing the integral roles women played in the social, political, economic, and spiritual realms of society, and miniature gold votives in the Muisca tradition.

=== Art of the Pacific Islands ===
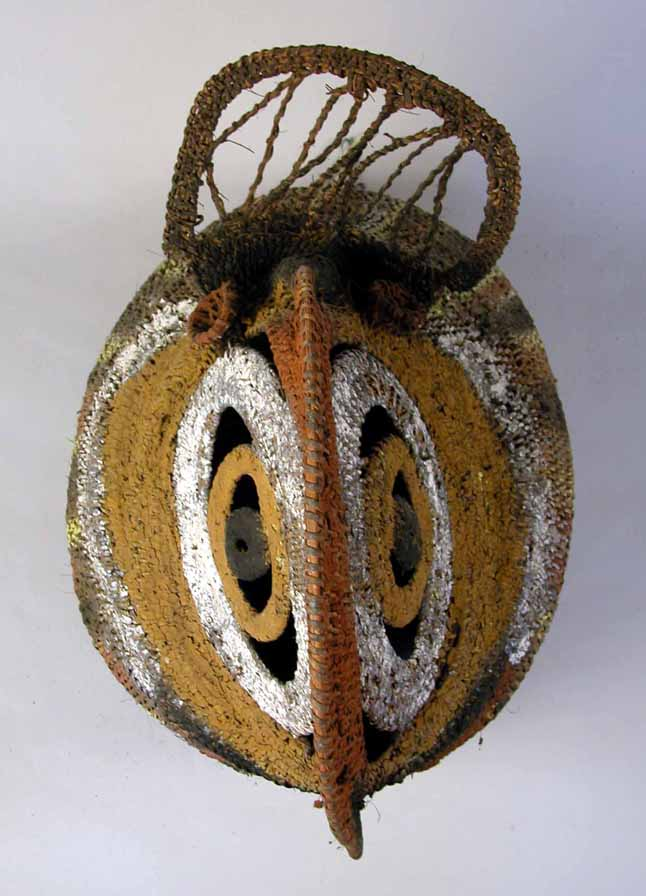
An unidentified 20th-century Abelam artist from Papua New Guinea at the museum

This exhibit includes artwork from several cultural traditions of the Pacific Islands, including Melanesia and Polynesia. Works in collection include jewelry, ornaments, and tapa cloths.

Of notable interest is a finely carved lizard of dark wood and shell from Easter Island, a battle pectoral created from hundreds of Nassa shells, which highlight Middi art of New Britain; and an 18th-century royal Hawaiian necklace.

Other highlights of the collection include a breast ornament embellished with small birds and stars that figured as insignia of prestige for the Tonga of the Fiji Islands. Featuring whale ivory and pearl shell design, it is recognized as one of the largest of its kind.

=== Asian art ===
The museum's Asian art collection includes works from China, Japan, India, Tibet, Southeast Asia, and the Near East. The collection is particularly known for its Chinese ceramics, with a particular depth in mortuary wares from the Tang dynasty (618–907) and utilitarian stoneware from the 11th through the 13th centuries. Although more than 1,000 objects are comprised in this collection, because of limited space, only a portion of the pieces are on display at one time. Works are on view in rotating installations in the museum's Julius Levy Memorial Gallery.

Some notable works in the collection include the life-sized early-15th-century bronze Guanyin, known widely as "Goddess of Mercy"; the robust figure of a horse from a Han dynasty tomb; a 39-piece mortuary retinue, a rare example of the quantities of clay figures that were placed in tombs during the early Tang dynasty; and an outstanding foliate-shaped brush washer that represents the mastery of Chinese blue-and-white porcelain. Asian art is also represented in other areas of the museum's collection, including 475 Japanese prints and 1,000 textiles from across Asia.

=== European art ===
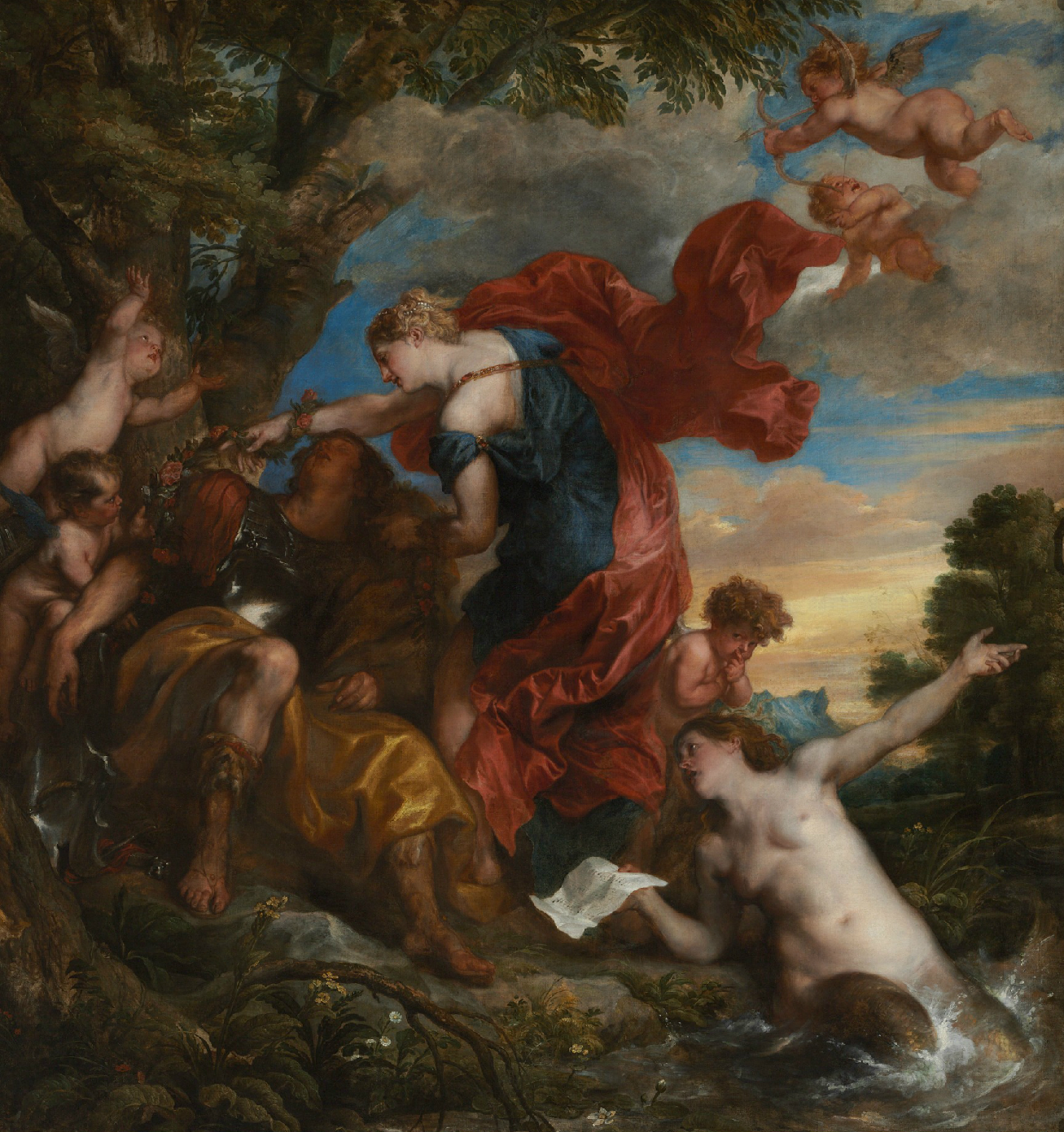
Rinaldo and Armida, a 1629 work by Sir Anthony van Dyck, at the museum

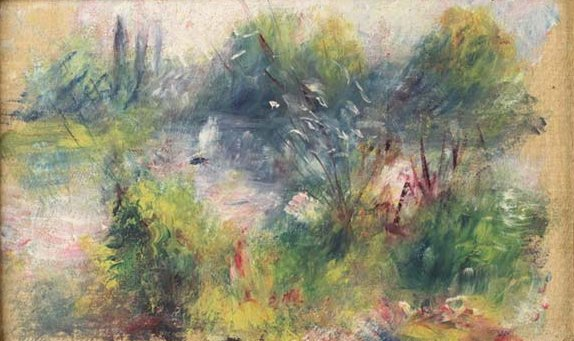
Paysage Bords de Seine, an 1879 work by Pierre-Auguste Renoir that was stolen in 1951 and resurfaced in 2012, at the museum

The European art collection at the BMA contains works from the 15th through 19th centuries. Most of the collection was formed through donations made by private citizens of the city of Baltimore, notably Mary Frick Jacobs, George A. Lucas, and Jacob Epstein. The collection contains a large selection of 19th-century French art, including more than 140 bronze animal sculptures by Antoine-Louis Barye and several paintings by Barbizon artists such as Jean-Baptiste-Camille Corot and impressionist Camille Pissarro.

The collection includes a wide array of decorative arts, including jeweled snuff boxes, porcelain, and silver. The museum also exhibits a large collection of works on paper from the 15th through the 19th century.

Highlights of the European art exhibit include Sir Anthony van Dyck's Rinaldo and Armida (1629), which was commissioned by King Charles I of England. It is considered one of the artist's finest paintings. Other items of northern European and French art include Frans Hals' portrait Dorothea Berck (1644), Rembrandt van Rijn's painting of his son Titus (1660), Jean-Baptiste-Siméon Chardin's portrayal of a lovely maiden tossing a ball in The Game of Knucklebones (c. 1734), and French court portraitist Louise Élisabeth Vigée Le Brun's exotic Princess Anna Alexandrovna Galitzin (c. 1797). Medieval and Renaissance works include a 14th-century Burgundian Virgin and Child carved of limestone and Titian's Portrait of a Gentleman (1561). There are also late-medieval and Renaissance paintings by Giovanni dal Ponte, Biagio D'Antonio, Sandro Botticelli and Workshop, Bernardino Luini, Francesco Ubertini, and Master of View of Saint Gudule.

In 2012, Paysage Bords de Seine, a Renoir stolen from the museum, resurfaced after being lost for 63 years. The painting then became the subject of a dramatic legal dispute involving the FBI, the woman who said she found the painting, an insurance company's rights to the artwork, and the intentions of Saidie May, an art collector who bought the painting in Paris in 1925 and lent it to the Baltimore museum. In 2014, a judge deemed it to be the property of the BMA after reviewing related documentation from its archives. At the time of the theft, Fireman's Fund Insurance Co. paid the museum about $2,500 for the loss. The company considered whether to make a claim for the painting when it resurfaced, but decided it "belonged" at the museum.

=== Cone Collection ===
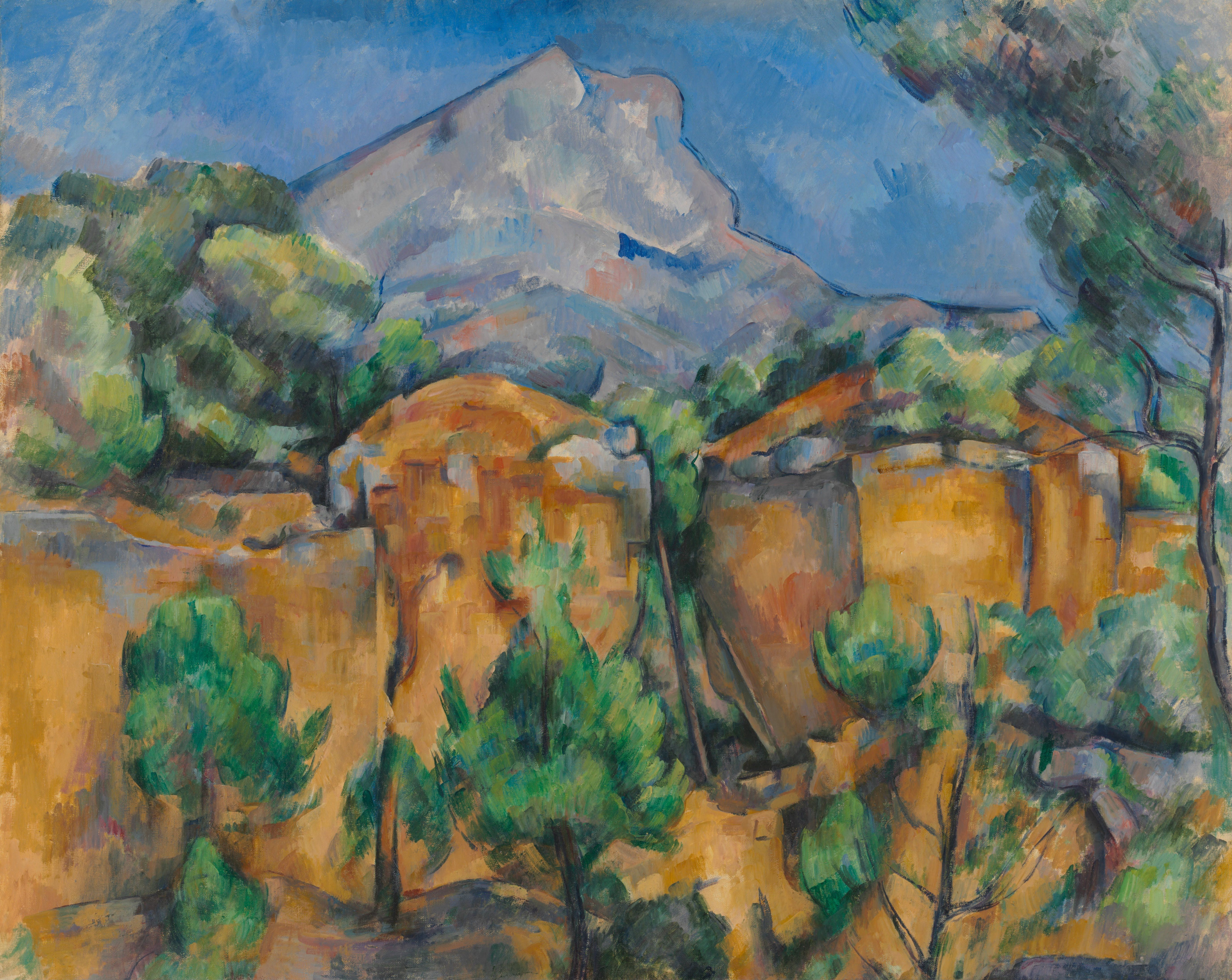
Mont Sainte-Victoire Seen from the Bibémus Quarry a c. 1897 by Paul Cézanne, at the museum

Baltimore sisters Claribel and Etta Cone amassed one of the most important collections of modern art in the U.S. and gave it to the BMA in 1949. Etta Cone began the Cone Collection in 1898 with the purchase of five paintings by American Impressionist Theodore Robinson to decorate their Baltimore home. Soon after, the sisters began to make annual trips to Paris where they visited museums, salons, and the studios of emerging artists. In 1906, Etta purchased her first work by Henri Matisse during a visit with the artist arranged by Gertrude Stein's sister-in-law, Sarah Stein. The Cone sisters were among the artist's first patrons and Etta, in particular, collected works throughout his entire career. Their collection of approximately 3,000 objects included 500 works by Matisse, as well as masterworks by Pablo Picasso, Vincent van Gogh, and Paul Cézanne, which were displayed in their Baltimore apartments prior to coming to the museum.

=== Contemporary art ===
The BMA's Contemporary Wing was built and opened in 1994, closed in January 2011 for renovations, and reopened in November 2012 with new wall and floor finishes; a gallery dedicated to light, sound, and moving image-based art; a dedicated gallery for prints, drawings and photographs; and BMA Go Mobile, a mobile website guide.

The renovated wing houses a two-part architectural intervention that made the BMA the first museum in the United States to commission and acquire a site-specific installation by artist Sarah Oppenheimer. The collection features works by Olafur Eliasson, Jasper Johns, Robert Rauschenberg, Franz West, Yayoi Kusama, Donald Judd, and other eminent artists alongside new acquisitions from 21st-century artists such as Josephine Meckseper, Sarah Sze, and Rirkrit Tiravanija. The works of American artist Bruce Nauman, known for his work with neon lights, can be seen both in the contemporary collection and adorning the outside of the museum itself with his piece Violins, Violence, Silence. The BMA has the second largest collection of Andy Warhol's late work in the U.S.

The Contemporary Wing will be reinstalled again in summer 2019 with a new presentation of 20th- and 21st-century art that focuses on the creativity of black artists such as Roy DeCarava, David Driskell, Joyce J. Scott, Lorna Simpson, and Jack Whitten.
