= Burlington Industries =

American fabric maker

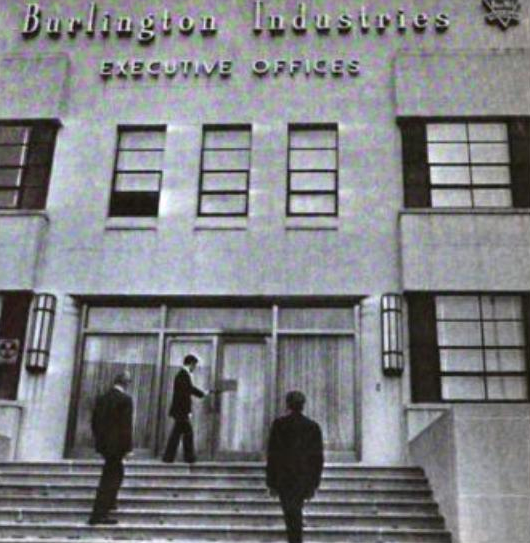
- Burlington Industries office building in 1970
- Type: Public
- Industry: Manufacturing
- Founded: 1923; 103 years ago in Burlington, North Carolina
- Founder: J. Spencer Love
- Defunct: 2003
- Fate: Acquired by International Textile Group
- Products: Textiles

Burlington Industries, formerly Burlington Mills, is a diversified American fabric maker based in Greensboro, North Carolina. Founded by J. Spencer Love in Burlington, North Carolina in 1923, the company is a subsidiary of Elevate Textiles and has operations in the United States and China.

== History ==
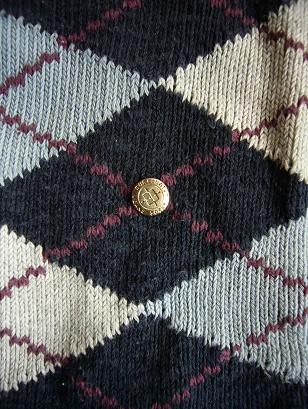
A Burlington Sock (in the mid-1990s)

On November 6, 1923 J. Spencer Love founded a textile corporation in Burlington, North Carolina. Love and his father brought to Burlington $50,000 worth of machinery from a factory they had sold in Gastonia, NC, and also invested $200,000 that they had earned from the sale of the Gastonia plant, as well as selling an additional $200,000 worth of stock to local residents. In early 1924 Love began construction on the Pioneer Plant and a mill village of 70 houses known as Piedmont Heights. The mill opened with about 200 workers. The operation initially produced cotton products without much success, but the company's situation improved once Love adopted rayon as the mill's fabric for manufacture shortly after it had been introduced to the Southern market. Love had a second mill built in 1928 and opened a sales office in New York City the following year.

During the Great Depression demand for rayon dramatically increased as it was a cheaper substitute for silk. Love acquired faltering textile mills across central North Carolina and fitted them with new looms that could process rayon. By 1935 Love operated the largest rayon-weaving operation in the United States. That year he moved his corporate headquarters to Greensboro. By 1936 he owned 22 factories in 9 locales. The following year he unified the plants as the Burlington Mills Corporation and had it listed on the New York Stock Exchange. Burlington Mills exclusively produced rayon until 1938 when it began making hosiery.

During World War II Burlington Mills sold nylon parachute cloth to the United States government. About 4,000 male employees served in the war and were replaced by female workers. Following the war the company diversified its operations, offering cotton and nylon commercial products, and it rapidly expanded. It also invested $50 million in revamping and expanding its facilities. In 1952 it became the first textile corporation to create a television advertisement. By then it was the largest synthetic textile producer in the world, overseeing 73 facilities and 31,000 workers. Three years later the company was reorganized as Burlington Industries with nine different divisions. In 1961 Fortune listed Burlington Industries as the 48th largest American corporation, with sales of $913 million and 62,000 employees in and outside of the country. Love died the following year and the company came under new management.

In 1966 Burlington Industries became involved in the furniture market by acquiring the Globe-Home Furniture Company of High Point. It purchased the United Furniture Company of Lexington two years later and National Upholstery of High Point in 1971. In 1970 the company opened a new headquarters building in Greensboro, designed by Odell Associates.

In the late 1970s and early 1980s Burlington Industries reinvested 85 percent of its revenue ($1.5 billion) in new equipment. By the end of the 1980s it retained 26,000 workers while mostly producing yarns, apparel fabrics, carpet, and upholstery. In 1987 the company was threatened with a hostile takeover from a Canadian textile corporation and a New York investor. Burlington's management borrowed $2.4 billion from Morgan Stanley to stop it and purchase the company through a leveraged buyout. As a result, in July 1987 the company laid off 525 workers and closed its research and development facility in Jamestown. The company was privatized from the buyout until relisting on the New York Stock Exchange in 1992.

The company experienced financial losses in the 1990s largely due to increased competition from cheaper foreign imports. It laid off employees and filed for Chapter 11 bankruptcy on November 15, 2001, with $800 million in outstanding debts. It subsequently closed seven facilities and terminated 6,650 positions. Private equity firm WL Ross & Co acquired Burlington's assets in 2003 for $614.1 million and Wilbur Ross appointed himself chairman of the company. As part of the restructuring, Burlington's carpet division was sold to Mohawk Industries for $352 million. The following year Ross merged Burlington with the Cone Mills Corporation to form the International Textile Group (ITG). Staff vacated the Burlington headquarters in November of that year and were merged with the other textile company staffs. The headquarters was imploded in May 2005. ITG retained "Burlington" as a brand name. ITG transformed into Elevate Textiles (a component of Platinum Equity) in January 2019, remaining the parent corporation of Burlington.

== Operations ==
Burlington Industries is headquartered in Greensboro, North Carolina. It oversees facilities in North Carolina, South Carolina, and China. It is a subsidiary of Elevate Textiles.

== Legacy ==
In 1955, Burlington Industries helped to fund the North Carolina State University reactor program. This was the first fission reactor built only to apply nuclear fission in peacetime for educational purposes. Because of their funding, the building is named Burlington Engineering Laboratories in honor of the company.

In 1998, the Supreme Court ruled in Burlington Industries, Inc. v. Ellerth that employers were responsible if a supervisor creates a hostile work environment for an employee.

== Works cited ==
- Bolden, Don (2010). Burlington. Arcadia Publishing. ISBN 9781439626474.
- Covington, Howard E.; Ellis, Marion A., eds. (2002). The North Carolina Century: Tar Heels who Made a Difference, 1900–2000. Levine Museum of the New South. ISBN 9780807827574.
- Glass, Brent D. (1992). The Textile Industry in North Carolina: A History. Raleigh: North Carolina Department of Cultural Resources Division of Archives and History. ISBN 9780865262560.
- Leiter, Jeffrey; Schulman, Michael D.; Zingraff, Rhonda, eds. (2019). Hanging by a Thread (reprint ed.). Cornell University Press. ISBN 9781501745249.
- Medlin, Eric (2023). Sawdust in Your Pockets : A History of the North Carolina Furniture Industry. Athens: University of Georgia Press. ISBN 9780820365503.
