= Cone Mills Corporation =

American textile manufacturer

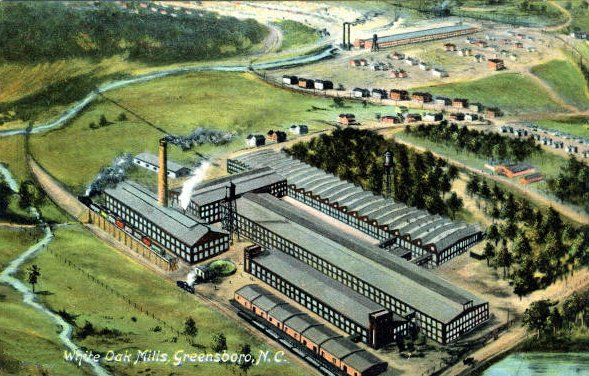
- White Oak Mill
- Industry: Textiles
- Founded: 1895
- Defunct: 2004
- Fate: Bankruptcy
- Successor: International Textile Group
- Headquarters: Greensboro, North Carolina
- Key people: Moses H. Cone

Cone Mills Corporation was an American textile manufacturing company. It produced cotton fabrics such as corduroy, flannel, and denim. The company headquartered in Greensboro, North Carolina.

== Early history ==
In 1887 brothers Moses H. and Caesar Cone began investing in textile mills in North Carolina. In 1891 they incorporated the Cone Export & Commission Company in New Jersey to broker Southern textile products in the North. Within several years the broker was trading products from almost 90 percent of all Southern textile mill owners. Two years later they established Southern Finishing & Warehouse Company in Greensboro, North Carolina.

In 1895 the Cone brothers began creating their own textile mills for the production of denim. That year they built Proximity Cotton Mills in Greensboro, with Caesar Cone serving as the Proximity Manufacturing Company's president. Four years later they partnered with two men from South Carolina to launch a flannel manufacturer, Revolution Mills, in Greensboro. In 1905 the Cones built a new denim plant for Proximity Manufacturing in Greensboro, White Oak Mill. Over subsequent years the brothers acquired controlling shares of other textile operations and expanded their business to cover other fabrics and textile-related processes.

== Mergers and reorganization ==
Revolution Mills and Proximity Manufacturing were merged to create the Cone Mills Corporation in 1948. Three years later, the corporation became publicly traded on the New York Stock Exchange. It also acquired Dwight Manufacturing of Alabama, a twill and drill producer. In 1977, the Environmental Protection Agency sued Cone Mills, accusing the firm of violating an earlier order by continuing to pollute a creek with residues from its Proximity mill in Greensboro. In response, Cone Mills shut the facility down and laid off 600 workers.

== Labor relations ==
=== Paternalism and philanthropy ===
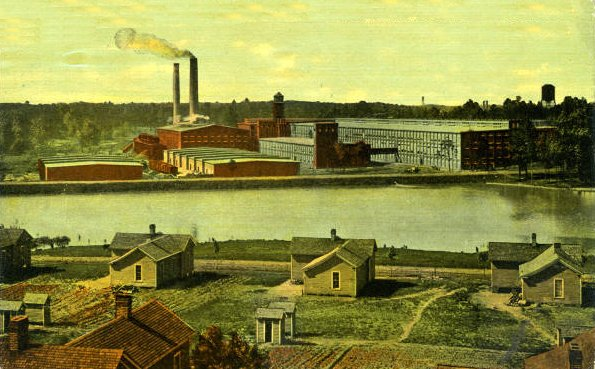
White Oak Mill with mill village, 1914

Like many other Southern textile companies during the early 20th century, the Cone Mills Corporation took a paternalistic approach towards its workers. The Cones sought to portray their company as primarily interested in promoting the general welfare of its employees—as opposed to being motivated by profits—and strove to maintain cordial relations with its workers without resorting to force. Their paternalism was often praised by contemporary observers and the local press.

At their peak, the Cone mill villages covered 450 acres (180 ha) and housed 2,675 workers in about 1,500 houses. It was the second largest mill community in the state, behind Cannon Mills' Kannapolis. Though incorporated into the city of Greensboro in 1923, the mill community lived largely separate lives from other city residents for decades. Many of the early workers had rural origins and reared livestock in the yards of their homes. East White Oak mill village housed African American workers. Until the 1960s, African Americans were restricted to menial jobs in Cone Mills facilities, such as work as janitors.

In 1944, an informal agreement between the company and the Greensboro city council dating to the villages' incorporation into the municipality allowing Cone Mills to pick the candidates for one of the council seats ended. Greensboro's social services were expanded into the villages, and the city assumed the responsibilities for law enforcement, garbage collection, and road maintenance in the area. It took over the mill schools and erected the community's first streetlights. The company sold off the village homes in the late 1940s.

From 1958 to 1969, Cone's factories furnished fabric for the wardrobes of the annual winner of the Miss North Carolina Pageant. They also provided fabric for the gowns each winner wore to the Miss America Pageant.

=== Unionization efforts and unrest ===
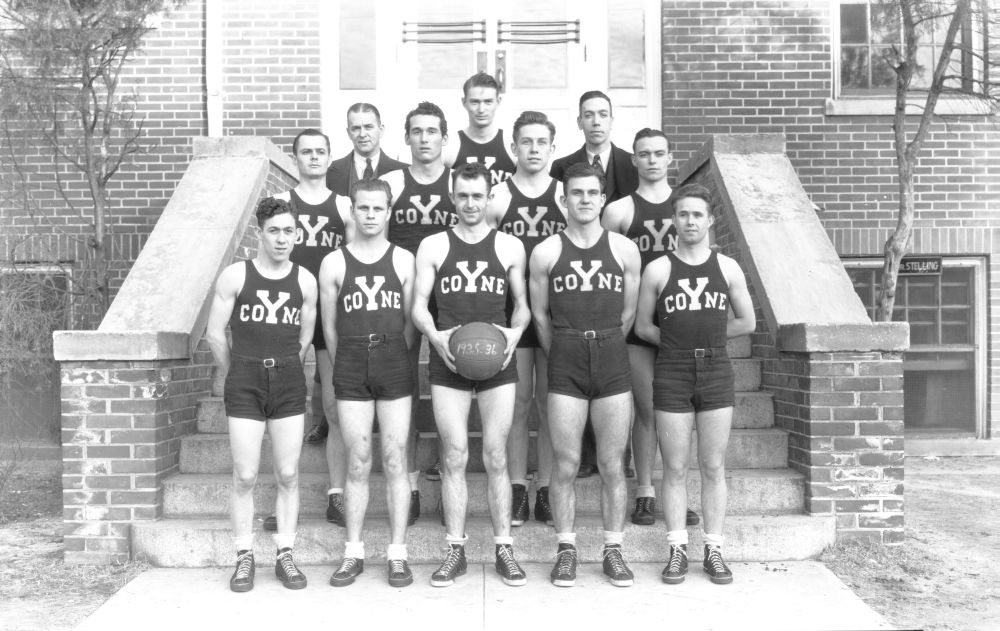
A Cone Mills basketball team in the 1920s. The corporation supported sports teams and other initiatives as part of its paternalistic efforts to bring "civilization" to its workers and ensuring their loyalty to the company.

Shortly after the opening of Proximity Mill in Greensboro, the National Union of Textile Workers attempted to organize workers in the Piedmont region. In response, Cone Mills directed dozens of operatives to surreptitiously join the union and Caesar Cone declared that he would rather destroy the Proximity facility than negotiate with a union. In 1900 the union went on strike. He temporarily closed the mill and surrounding company stores and hired watchmen to patrol the nearby villages. When union members refused to leave their organization, Cone Mills evicted them and their families from the villages. This quickly led to the collapse of the local union, as unionists either lost their jobs and moved elsewhere or quit the organization and signed yellow-dog contracts with the company.

The 1900 strike damaged Cone Mills' public image. Seeking to restore the company's reputation and protect its increasing profitability, corporate leaders attempted to reform their relationship with the workforce and present themselves as benevolent managers with the aim of making the workforce more loyal to the company. To achieve this, members of the Cone family personally inserted themselves into the lives of the workers, often walking through the villages and greeting workers by name, handing out Christmas gifts to children, and individually intervening with troubled workers to provide them with money or wage increases. The company hosted large events and celebrations for its workers including an annual Fourth of July picnic, at which the Cones often delivered speeches. Cone Mills also established welfare programs, schools, and clinics and sponsored orchestras and sports teams with the aim of bringing "civilization" to their primarily rural workforce. After 1910 they focused on improving living conditions in the mill villages, paving streets and building new homes with running water and electricity and space for gardening. During World War I, when the labor market was tight, Cone Mills subsidized certain food products in its stores and worked to ensure availability for consumer products for its workers despite shortages.

Cone Mills' paternalistic approach towards its workers generally succeeded in maintaining positive labor relations from 1900 to 1925. While some workers did display individual discontent with their work and leave, many stayed knowing that conditions at other textile plants in the region were worse. In the 1920s demand for textile products declined. Cotton and tobacco prices plummeted, leading many farmers to approach mills for work. Confronted with a labor surplus and a need to cut costs, in 1925 company leaders began cutting pay, laying off staff, and assigning the remaining workers more responsibilities. Workers referred to this strategy as the "stretch-out". Many workers felt betrayed by Cone Mills, and thereafter the company's paternalistic system became more fraught with conflict. Workers at the White Oak mills hosted several small strikes until an agreement to ease demands placed upon them was arbitrated.

At the same time as the stretch-out, Cone Mills began implementing other changes to the functioning of its mills, including the adoption of scientific management practices and introduction of new machinery. Following Caesar's death, his brother Bernard assumed leadership of the company and began hiring professional, college-trained supervisors, thus phasing out the longstanding practice of promoting from within. The Cones continued with many of their paternalistic practices as before, such as personally engaging with workers and hosting events, but relations between management and the workers were never fully restored.

Discontent persisted until May 1930, when one-third of Cone Mills' workforce attended a United Textile Workers of America (UTW) rally on the outskirts of Greensboro. A follow-up rally in June led to the formation of a UTW local union affiliate. In response, Cone Mills ordered the eviction of union members from their homes. UTW then shifted its strategy from criticizing stretch-outs to directly attacking the Cones' accumulated wealth and management style. Evictions continued throughout the summer, and the unionization drive eventually collapsed under a combination of pressure exerted by the Cones and the economic conditions of the Great Depression, which left mill workers with few alternatives. Despite the resolution in the company's favor, many workers' loyalty to the company was permanently shaken by the events. Challenges to the Cones' management continued throughout the 1930s and 1940s, aided by new labor protections introduced by the New Deal. After World War II, Cone Mills ended its pursuit of paternalism, selling off the mill villages, terminating its welfare programs, and shifting to a more detached style of worker management. In April 1951, over half of Cone Mills' unionized workers went on strike, leading the Dwight Manufacturing mill in Alabama to completely shut down.

== Decline and acquisition ==
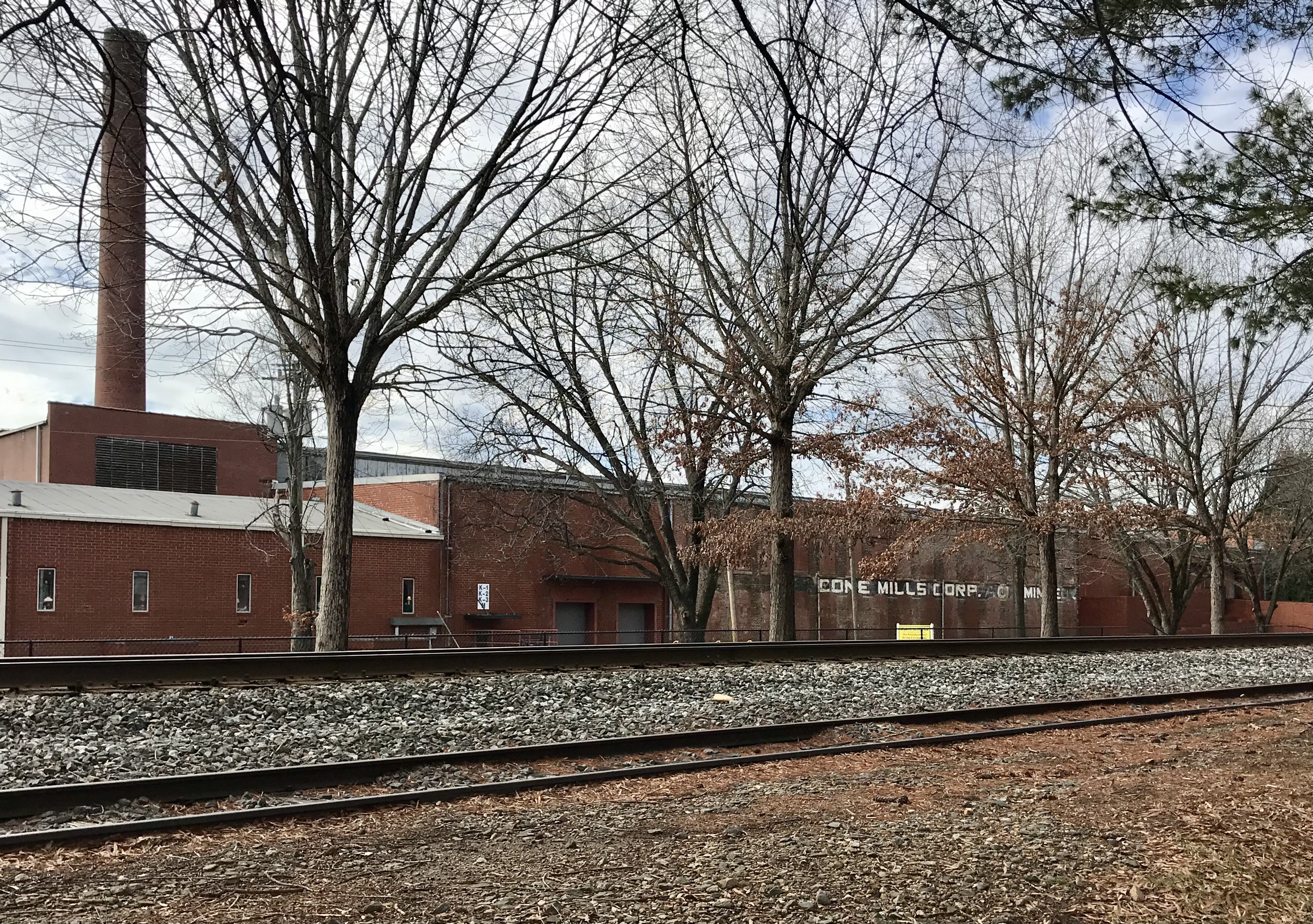
Former Cone Mills-owned Minneola Manufacturing complex in Gibsonville, 2023

The Cone Mills Corporation faced intense competition from foreign textile companies in the 1980s. In 1983, Western Pacific Industries attempted a hostile takeover of the firm after a deal to acquire shares from Caesar Cone II. At the time, the company had 16 plants. The deal was thwarted by a leveraged buyout by 47 members of management, after which the company made several cutbacks. Lawsuits related to the buyout lingered into the 1990s. Debt refinancing from the 1984 buyout continued as late as 1992, when the company offered shares to the public and obtained new loans.

The firm closed its operation at Salisbury, North Carolina, in 1999, citing additional overseas fabric imports and years of heavy losses. The Salisbury mill had been in business since 1888. In 2000, the Raytex plant at Marion, South Carolina, was closed, taking with it 200 jobs, as demand for comforters and bedspreads declined.

Weakened by foreign competition, lower consumption of denim, and higher material costs, the Cone Mills Corporation filed for Chapter 11 bankruptcy in 2003. Two of the company's three facilities in Rutherford County, North Carolina, were then shuttered, resulting in the loss of 625 jobs.

In 2004 WL Ross & Co acquired Cone Mills and merged it with Burlington Industries to create the International Textile Group. The White Oak Mill was closed in 2017. International Textile Group transformed into Elevate Textiles, a property of Platinum Equity, in January 2019, remaining the parent corporation of Cone Denim.

== Sources ==
- English, Beth (2010). Common Thread. Rowman & Littlefield. ISBN 9780820336695. Archived from the original on September 5, 2021.
- Covington, Howard E. Jr. (2008). Once Upon City: Greensboro, North Carolina's 2nd Century. Greensboro Historical Museum. ISBN 9781491730263.
- Filene, Benjamin (2014). "Power in Limits: Narrow Frames Open Up African American Public History". In van Balgooy, Max A. (ed.). Interpreting African American History. Interpreting History. Vol. 3. Rowman & Littlefield. pp. 135–46. ISBN 9780759122802. Archived from the original on August 12, 2021.
- Leiter, Jeffrey; Schulman, Michael D.; Zingraff, Rhonda, eds. (2019). Hanging by a Thread (reprint ed.). Cornell University Press. ISBN 9781501745249.
