= Elevate Textiles =

American textile company

Elevate Textiles owns textile brands including American & Efird, Burlington, Cone Denim, Gütermann and Safety Components. Its global headquarters are in Charlotte, North Carolina.

The company was founded by Wilbur Ross and was sold to Platinum Equity in 2016. In 2019, the company changed its name from International Textile Group to Elevate Textiles.

Jeffrey P. Pritchett became the Chief Executive Officer on April 23, 2024.

== History ==
The company was founded by Wilbur Ross. WL Ross & Co acquired the assets of the former Burlington Industries out of bankruptcy in late 2003, and the assets of the former Cone Mills Corporation in 2004.

After outbidding Warren Buffett, who offered $579 million, WL Ross & Co acquired Burlington Industries for $620 million and combined it with Cone Mills in 2004 to form International Textile Group.

In 2005, Ross acquired 77.3% of Safety Components International for $51.2 million.

In October 2006, Ross had International Textile Group acquire Safety Components International. Ross controlled both companies and in February 2014, Ross paid $81 million to settle a lawsuit brought by shareholders that Ross breached his fiduciary duty when structuring the merger. International Textile Group was acquired by private equity firm Platinum Equity in 2016.

In 2006, ITG merged with Safety Components International, Inc., a Greenville, South Carolina, company that manufactures nylon fabrics that are used in automotive airbags, that was also controlled by Wilbur Ross.

In January 2007, ITG announced that it was selling it mattress fabric product line to Culp, Inc., another U.S. textile company that is based in High Point, North Carolina. Also during 2007, the Company has opened a mill in China that will develop apparel and interior fabrics and the Company is developing a Vietnam venture that will supply apparel fabrics and garments.

On April 1, 2007, BST Safety Textiles came into the ITG family of business. By adding BST Safety Textiles ITG's business in automotive components has now grown significantly. However, in the summer of 2009, ITG's air bag unit filed bankruptcy and was taken over by secured creditors.

In December 2006, Wilbur Ross completed the purchase of BST Safety Textiles GmbH (BST), previously known as Berger Safety Textiles, of Maulburg, Germany. BST is a producer of flat fabric used in manufacturing automobile airbags, one piece woven (known as OPW) airbags, and narrow fabric used in automobile seatbelts and all types of industrial strapping applications. BST currently operates locations in southern Germany, Poland, and the US in Virginia. BST employs over 1200 persons worldwide.

In 2008, ITG sold trademark rights to the Burlington brand for men's clothing and accessories to Falke, a German fashion company.

ITG was sold to private equity firm Platinum Equity in 2016, and later moved its headquarters to its parent company's home city of Beverly Hills.

ITG announced layoffs at its Greensboro-based White Oak denim mill in April 2009. ITG closed the White Oak mill entirely on December 31, 2017, after 110 years of operation.

The venture capital firm Platinum Equity followed its 2016 purchase of ITG with the acquisition of Mount Holly, North Carolina–based thread maker American & Efrid in 2018. In 2019, Platinum consolidated ITG, American & Efrid, and other fabric and materials manufacturers into the new Elevate Textiles.

== Operations ==
ITG's operating companies included Cone Denim, Burlington WorldWide Apparel, Burlington House Interior Fabrics, Carlisle Finishing, and Automotive Safety Textiles.

After the 2003 establishment of the company, ITG continued to manufacture fabrics in North America, but it also opened fabric mills in China, Vietnam and Central America. Its best-known fabrics are denim and specialty nylon fabrics used in automotive airbag systems.

ITG denim fabrics were made in the United States in Greensboro, North Carolina, in Mexico, and at the time newer company plants in China and Nicaragua. In the summer of 2009, ITG reported that it had ceased operations at the newly-opened Nicaragua mill.

Many ready-to-wear brands purchase fabrics from Cone Denim, including Levi's, Wrangler and American Eagle Outfitters. The company is also known for its worsted wool fabrics, which are made in North Carolina and in Mexico. The company has developed a source for wool fabrics in India by working with OCM India Limited, a mill in Amritsar, India, which is also owned by funds controlled by W.L. Ross & Co. Customers of the wool fabrics include many well-known makers of wool garments such as Jos A. Bank and others. The company also produces some technical fabrics, such as fabrics made of polyester and nylon. These fabrics have a variety of uses, such as in uniforms, in performance apparel items, and for safety services.

The ITG Automotive Group manufactured fabrics and cushion for airbags, which are sold to automotive safety groups, such as Autoliv, TRW and Delphi. Many automobiles throughout the world contain ITG's safety fabrics. The fabrics and cushion were manufactured in various locations, including the United States, Germany, Poland, China, and Mexico.
