= Battle of the Styles =

Conflict between supporters of architectural styles

The Battle of the Styles is a term used to refer to the conflict between supporters of the Gothic style and the Classical style in architecture. In Britain this led to public debates between Decimus Burton and Augustus Pugin.

Later in the century the revival of vernacular architecture led to an increasing palette of styles from which architects could choose, including Queen Anne style and "Tudorbethan" models. Numerous stylistic options led to a debate about prefabricated stylistic options in architecture, which eventually mutated into the Arts and Crafts style and then into Modernism.

== See also ==
- List of architectural styles
