= ICAA =

ICAA may refer to:

- Argentine Catholic Apostolic Church (Iglesia Católica Apostólica Argentina), a derivative movement of the Brazilian Catholic Apostolic Church
- Industrial Conciliation and Arbitration Act 1894, a piece of industrial relations legislation passed by the Parliament of New Zealand in 1894
- Institute of Chartered Accountants in Australia, the professional accounting body representing Chartered Accountants in Australia
- Institute of Cinematography and Audiovisual Arts (Instituto de la Cinematografía y de las Artes Audiovisuales), a project of the Spanish Ministry of Culture and Sport
- The Institute of Classical Architecture and Art, an American organization dedicated to the promotion of traditional and classical architecture and crafts.
