= Robert Adam (architect, born 1948) =

British architect (born 1948)

Professor Robert Adam
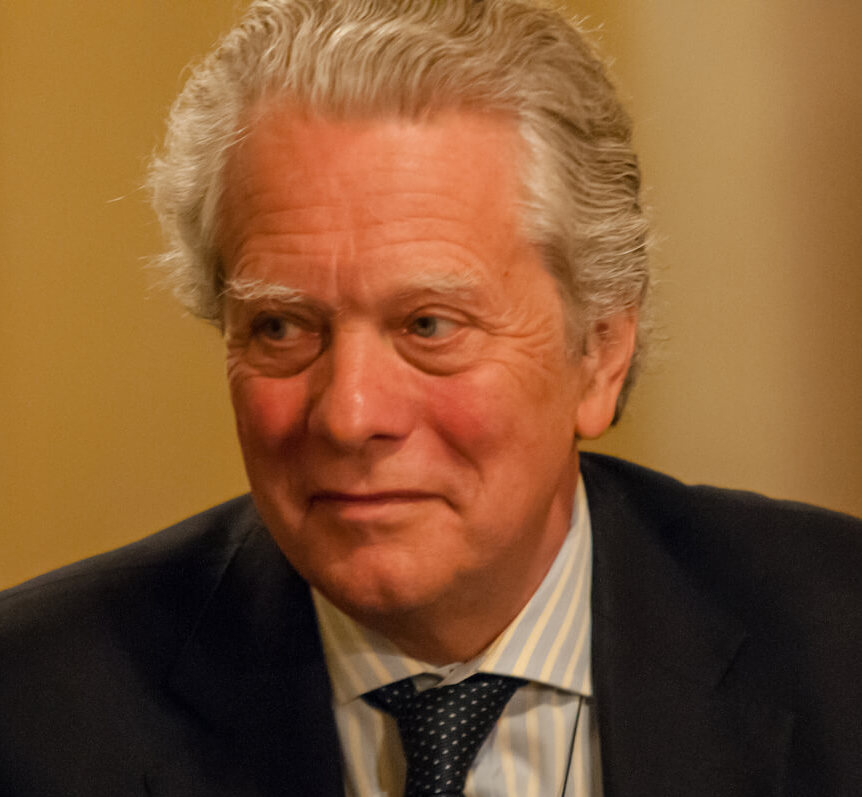
- Adam in 2022
- Born: 1948 (age 77–78)
- Citizenship: UK
- Education: University of Westminster
- Occupations: Architect; Author
- Era: 1980s–present
- Notable work: Sackler Library; Masterplan for Western Harbour, Edinburgh
- Awards: Driehaus Architecture Prize
- Website: Official website

Robert Adam FRIAS (born 1948) is a Driehaus Architecture Prize winning British architect, urban designer and author, known for championing classical and traditional styles. Adam is a visiting professor at the University of Strathclyde and Design Council Expert.

His career was the subject of Richard John's Robert Adam and the Search for a Modern Classicism, a survey of Adam's projects with a foreword by Charles, Prince of Wales.

== Education and early career ==
Adam attended the University of Westminster. In 1973, he won the British School at Rome's Rome Prize in Architecture.

Adam practiced as an architect, working part-time as a freelance architectural journalist until 1977, when he became partner at a firm in Winchester. In 1992, he founded Robert Adam Architects there.

== Work ==
=== Edinburgh Forthside ===
Adam was appointed master-planner of Edinburgh Forthside in which capacity he designed streetscapes of low-rise buildings in Leith and Granton.

Adam prescribed strict design codes on the area's developers so that both modern and traditional architects could build alongside one another without clashing. Builders had to adhere to guidelines on size, materials and proportions. Adam also laid out rules on how the buildings relate to the streets such as a ban on glass facades.

=== Bodleian Art, Archaeology and Ancient World Library ===
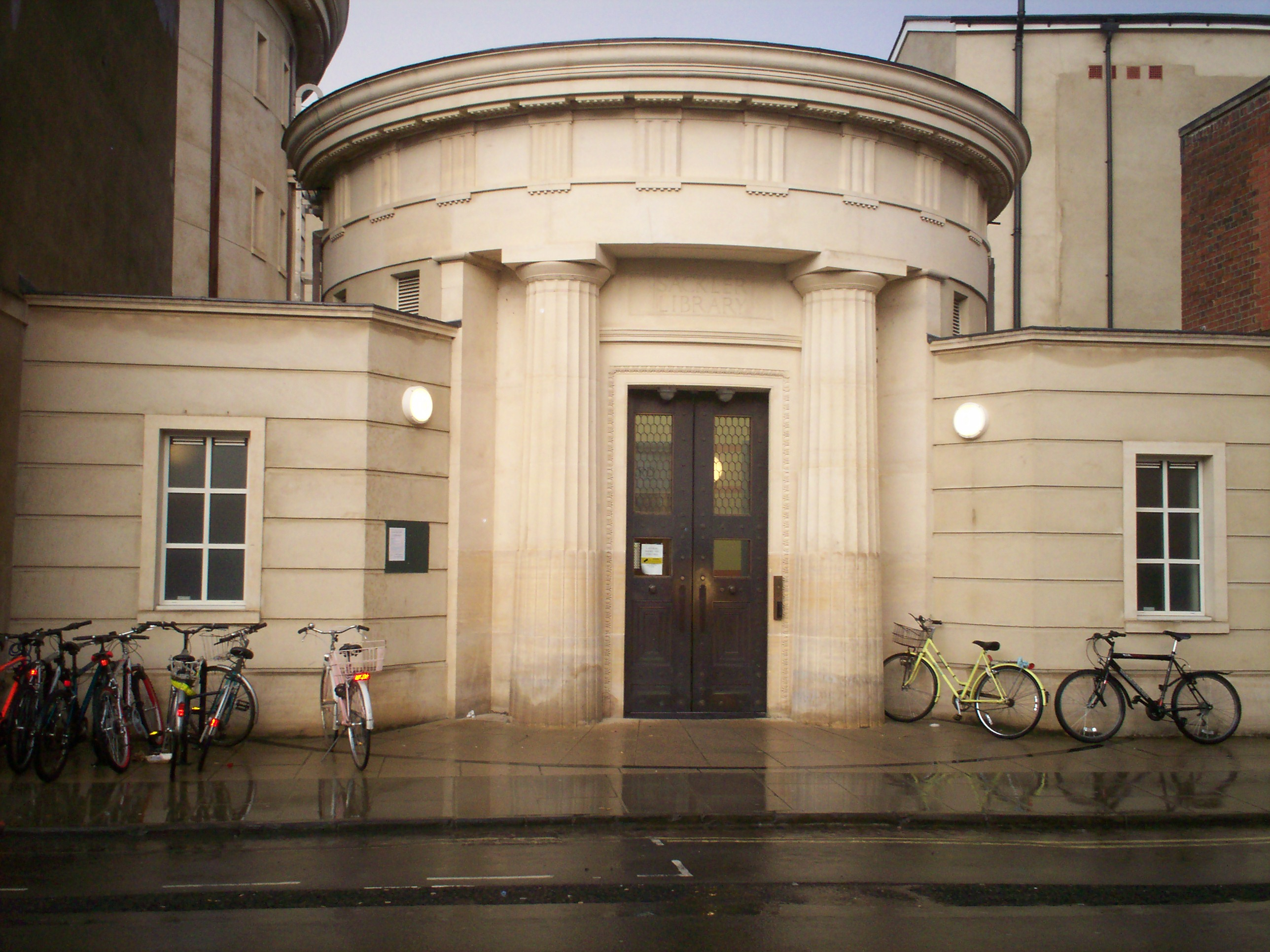
Entrance to the Bodleian Art, Archaeology and Ancient World Library designed by Robert Adam.

Adam designed Oxford University’s Bodleian Art, Archaeology and Ancient World Library, which opened in 2001 and incorporated Oxford's Ashmolean Museum collections. The principal building is a circular library, with a smaller circular entrance onto the street, and attached wings arranged around internal courtyards. His design referenced ancient Greek architecture, specifically the Temple of Apollo at Bassae.

=== Ashley Park ===
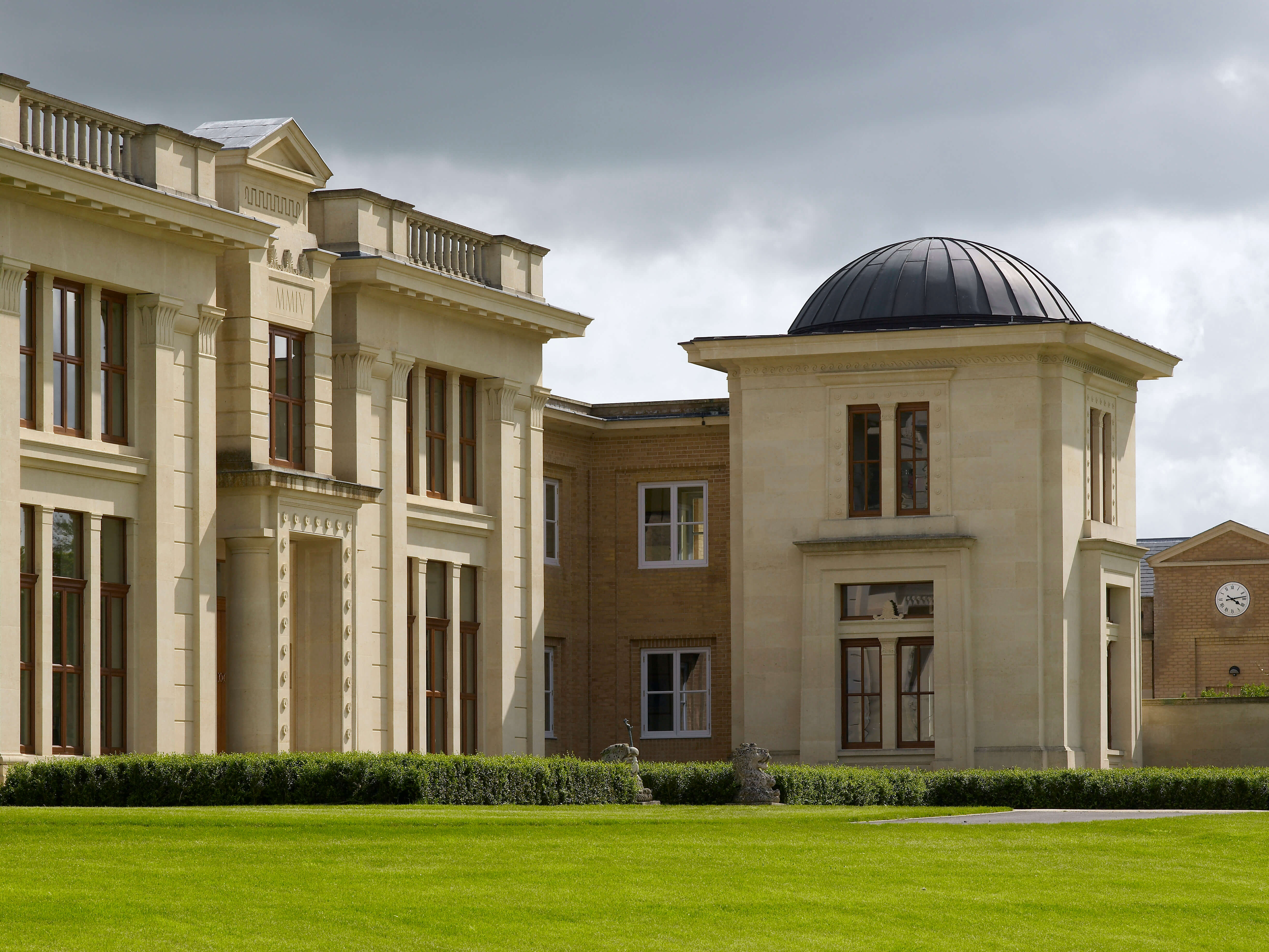
Ashley Park in Hampshire, photo by Paul Barker

Ashley Park, Hampshire, a new country house, completed in 2004, was the first new building to gain permission under 1997 English planning regulations that allowed major new houses in the countryside. It was described by the government inspector that granted the permission as, "an innovative approach to the classical traditions, re-interpreted for the 21st century."

=== 198–202, Piccadilly ===
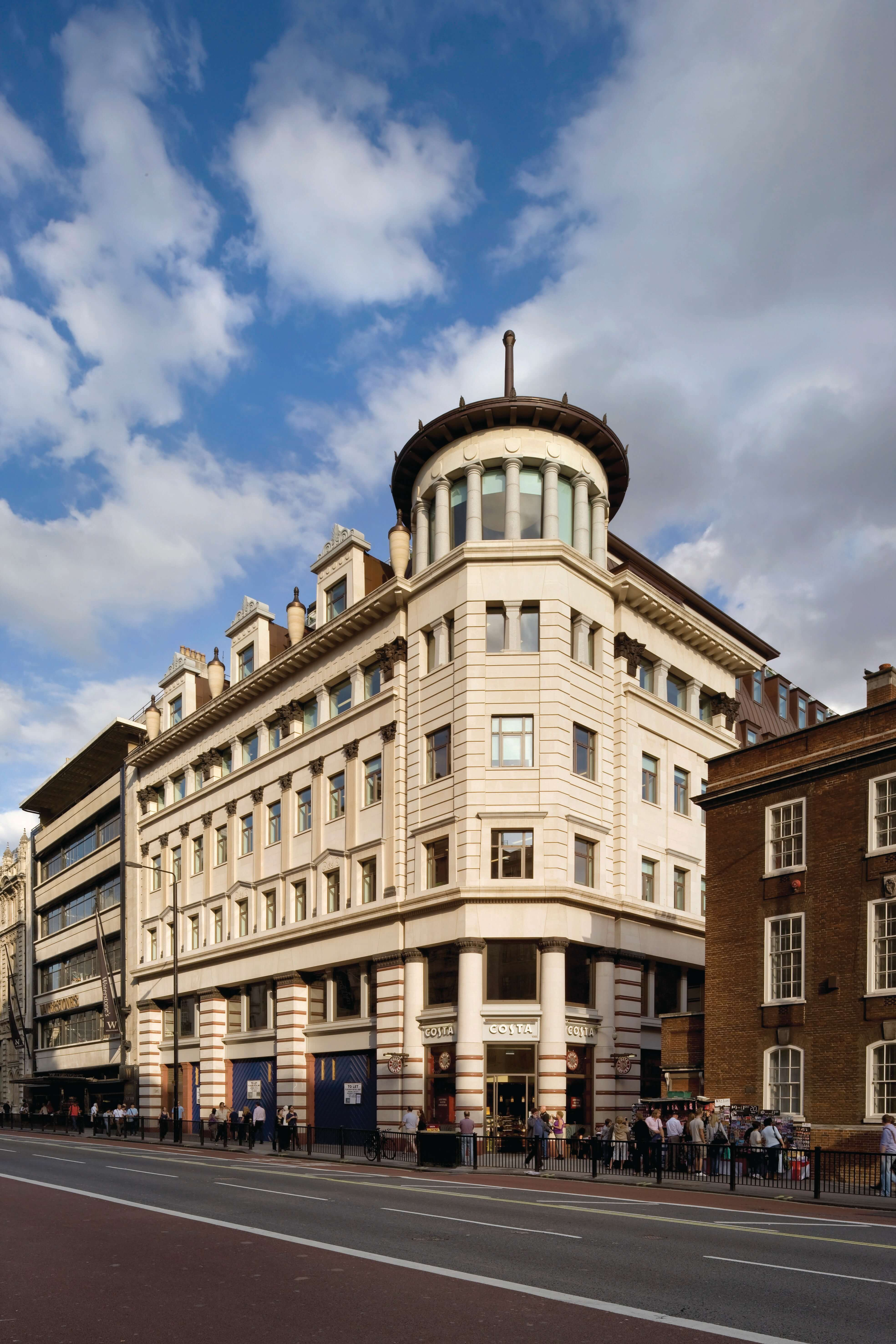
198-202 Piccadilly, London, photo by Morley von Sternberg

198–202 Piccadilly, London, an office development with ground floor retail, was completed in 2007. The classical building was designed to fit within the established historic setting. An octagonal tower marks the corner of the site and, at the upper levels, a colonnaded glass rooftop pavilion screens the plant rooms. Each façade is detailed to reflect the character of that street and the design incorporates cast bronze column capitals by classical sculptor, Alexander Stoddart.

== Books ==
- Classical Architecture: A Complete Handbook, (1990) London:Viking
- The 7 Sins of Architects, (2010)
- The Globalisation of Modern Architecture: The Impact of Politics, Economics and Social Change on Architecture and Urban Design since 1990, (2012) Newcastle upon Tyne:Cambridge Scholars Publishing
- Classic Columns: 40 Years of Writing on Architecture, (2017) Cumulus
- Time for Architecture: On Modernity, Memory and Time in Architecture and Urban Design, (2020) Newcastle upon Tyne:Cambridge Scholars Publishing

== Exhibits ==
Pembroke Table (1986), a drop-leaf table designed by Robert Adam in the permanent collection of the Victoria and Albert Museum, cited by the museum as "an example of the revivalism that has become a significant, if much debated, part of 1980s architecture and design."

Tower of the Orders – A drawing by Adam, displayed at RIBA, intended to represent the "continuity of classicism with the antique architectural orders".

== Awards ==
- Lifetime Achievement Award, The Traditional Architecture Group, 2022.
- Driehaus Architecture Prize, 2017.
- The Institute of Classical Architecture and Art – Arthur Ross Awards, 2015.
- The Georgian Group Awards, 2014 – Giles Worsley Award for New Building in a Georgian Context.
- The Georgian Group Awards, 2007– Best New Building in the Classical Tradition.
