= Nir Buras =

American architect, urban planner, and author

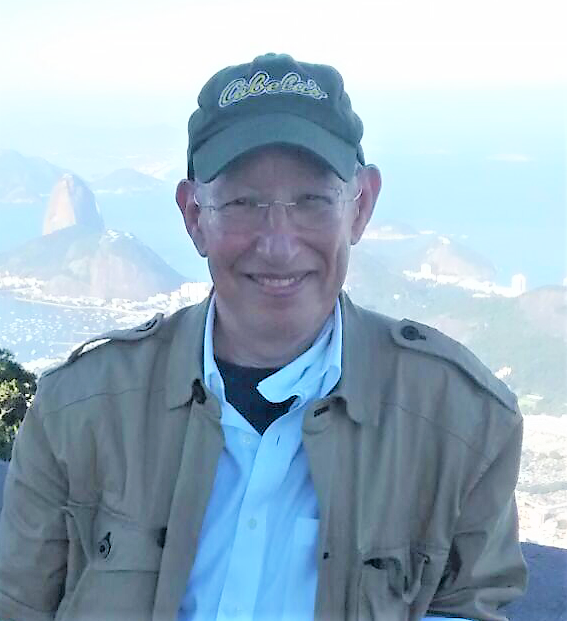

Nir Haim Buras (Hebrew: ניר חיים בורס) is an Israeli-American architect, urban planner, author, educator, and endorser of the New Classical Architecture movement. He founded the Classic Planning Institute in Washington, D.C. after having published his book, "The Art of Classic Planning: Building Beautiful and Enduring Communities", with support from the Driehaus Foundation.

== Career ==
Buras began as a military architect and planner in the Israeli Army (Tzahal). Following that, he worked for Gensler in San Francisco; Skidmore, Owings & Merrill in Los Angeles; as well as architect Ron Goldman (Goldman Firth Rossi) in Malibu. Following his Ph.D. studies, Buras served as Senior Architect and Design Principal at HNTB, and later as Lead Designer at AECOM for the East Side Access project at Grand Central Terminal, New York City. Freelancing in Washington, D.C., Buras worked on buildings in the US Capitol Complex. and established his own firm in Washington, D.C. (closed 2012). Since 2005 he is in charge of the famous Anacostia River Masterplan–also named MacMillan II–that envisions future urban growth and Parisian riverfronts and quays at Washington, D.C. He founded the Washington, D.C. Chapter of the Institute of Classical Architecture and Arts (ICAA) and after publishing his book, "The Art of Classic Planning: Building Beautiful and Enduring Communities", Buras founded the Classic Planning Institute in 2021. Since then, the CPI has engaged in architecture and urban planning practice, research, and education. In addition, the CPI hosts the Traditional Architecture Gathering (TAG) annual international conferences, where hundreds of architects, urbanists and enthusiasts engage in open forum live-video discussions about all subjects related to New Classic Architecture and Traditional Urbanism. Buras has taught at the Technion, Israel, the University of Southern California and the Woodbury University, both in Los Angeles. He has been a guest critic as well at the Notre Dame University, Indiana, the University of Maryland, the National Civic Art Society, and the Ax:son Johnson Centre for the Study of Classical Architecture (CSCA) at the University of Cambridge. Buras continues to teach and engage in academic research at the Classic Planning Institute.

== The Art of Classic Planning ==
Buras’ book, "The Art of Classic Planning: Building Beautiful and Enduring Communities,” (2020) documents and extends the urban practices put in place prior to the professionalization of planning and urbanism. "The Art of Classic Planning" has received mostly positive reviews from professionals and academics aligned to the New Classical Architecture movement–including such exponents as Léon Krier, Nikos Salingaros, and James Stevens Curl, as well as from American conservative outlets. A favorable review mentioned that "by so memorably reestablishing the fundamentals of urban design and planning, The Art of Classic Planning will be a strategic addition to any architecture or urban planning library" (Favermann, 2020); whereas an architectural historian criticized the book for using "spurious and historically flawed arguments" as well as having a "polemical, skewed history of urbanism and architecture" (Hewitt, 2020). A significant aspect of the book may be its intersection of neuroaesthetics, evolutionary psychology, urban design, and architectural experience.

== The Classic Planning Institute ==
The Classic Planning Institute (CPI) was established in 2021 in Washington, D.C., after Buras’ book “The Art of Classic Planning: Building Beautiful and Enduring Communities” received general positive feedback worldwide. The CPI stated mission is: “to make the world more beautiful, sustainable and healthy through improving the built environment”. The CPI applies “the classical method of urban planning and traditional architecture”; in a reportedly holistic manner, the CPI takes into account several areas of urban planning that include: traditional traffic planning; farming and agriculture; traditional waterfronts; traditional building arts; design neuroscience; oceans, lakes and rivers stewardship; climatic and seismic resilience; forest management; environment stewardship; mining and metallurgy. The CPI works under 5 main principles:

1. Plan cities based on community aspiration.
2. There is no good urbanism without good architecture.
3. Plan and design for long-term resilience.
4. Respect the magic of a place, and balance town and country.
5. Design and build cities based on timeless wisdom.
