= Putterij =

Former neighbourhood in Brussels, Belgium

Coordinates: 50°50′45.3″N 4°21′26.5″E

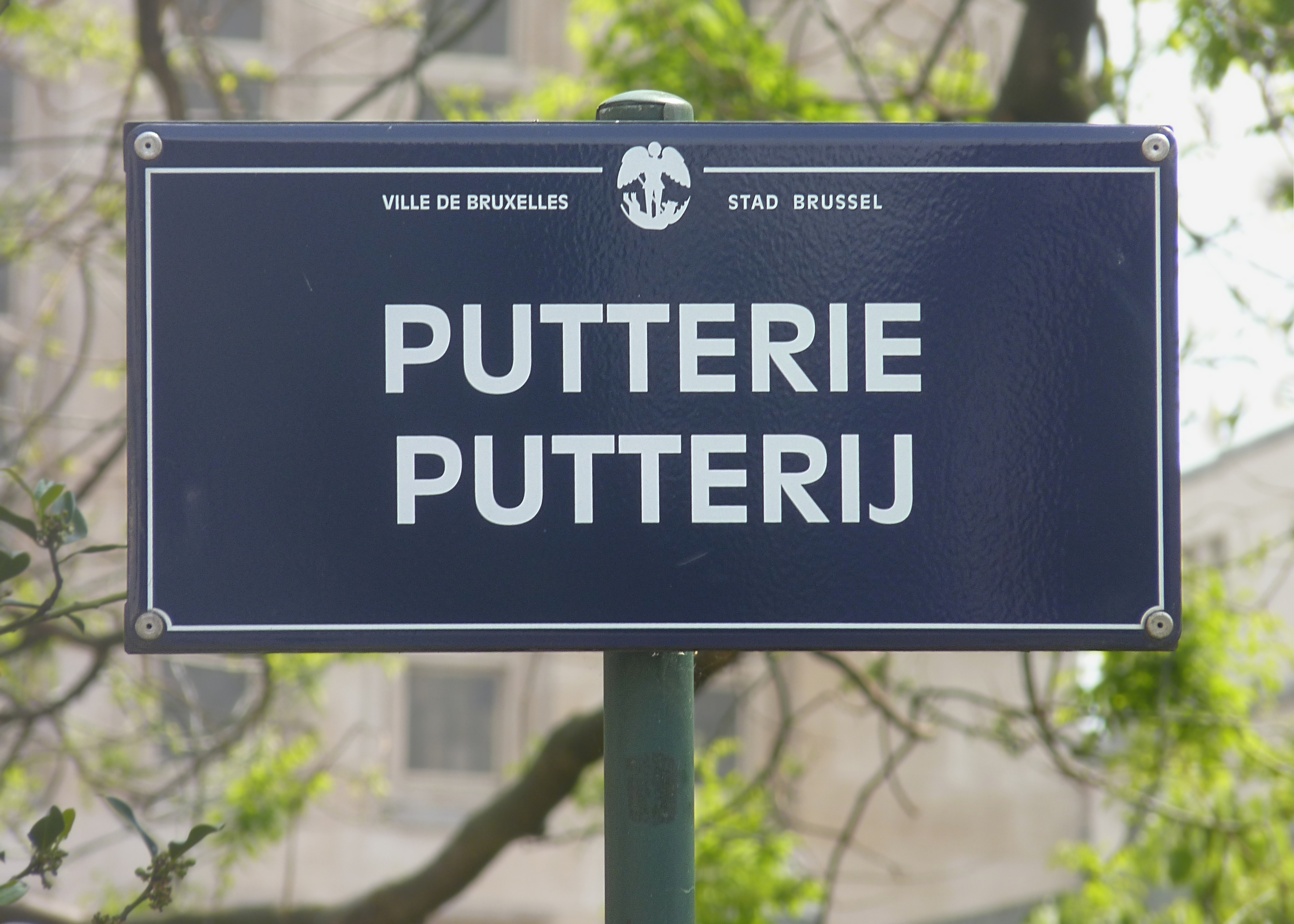
Street sign of the Putterie/Putterij

The Putterie (French, pronounced [pytʁi]) or Putterij (Dutch, pronounced [ˌpʏtəˈrɛi]) is a former quarter of central Brussels, Belgium. The district was centred around Saint Mary Magdalene's Church, between the Rue de la Montagne/Bergstraat, the Rue de la Madeleine/Magdalenastraat and the current Boulevard de l’Impératrice/Keizerinlaan. It was largely destroyed starting in the 1920s with the works of the North–South connection, a major railway link through central Brussels, to develop the area for Brussels-Central railway station and other modern office buildings. Many historic structures were lost in the demolition process.

Some of the area was redeveloped in the 1980s and 1990s with varying degrees of success, with buildings in the New Classical architecture and the New Brick Renaissance style, following the principles of New Urbanism and the European Urban Renaissance. The name of the street has survived to this day.

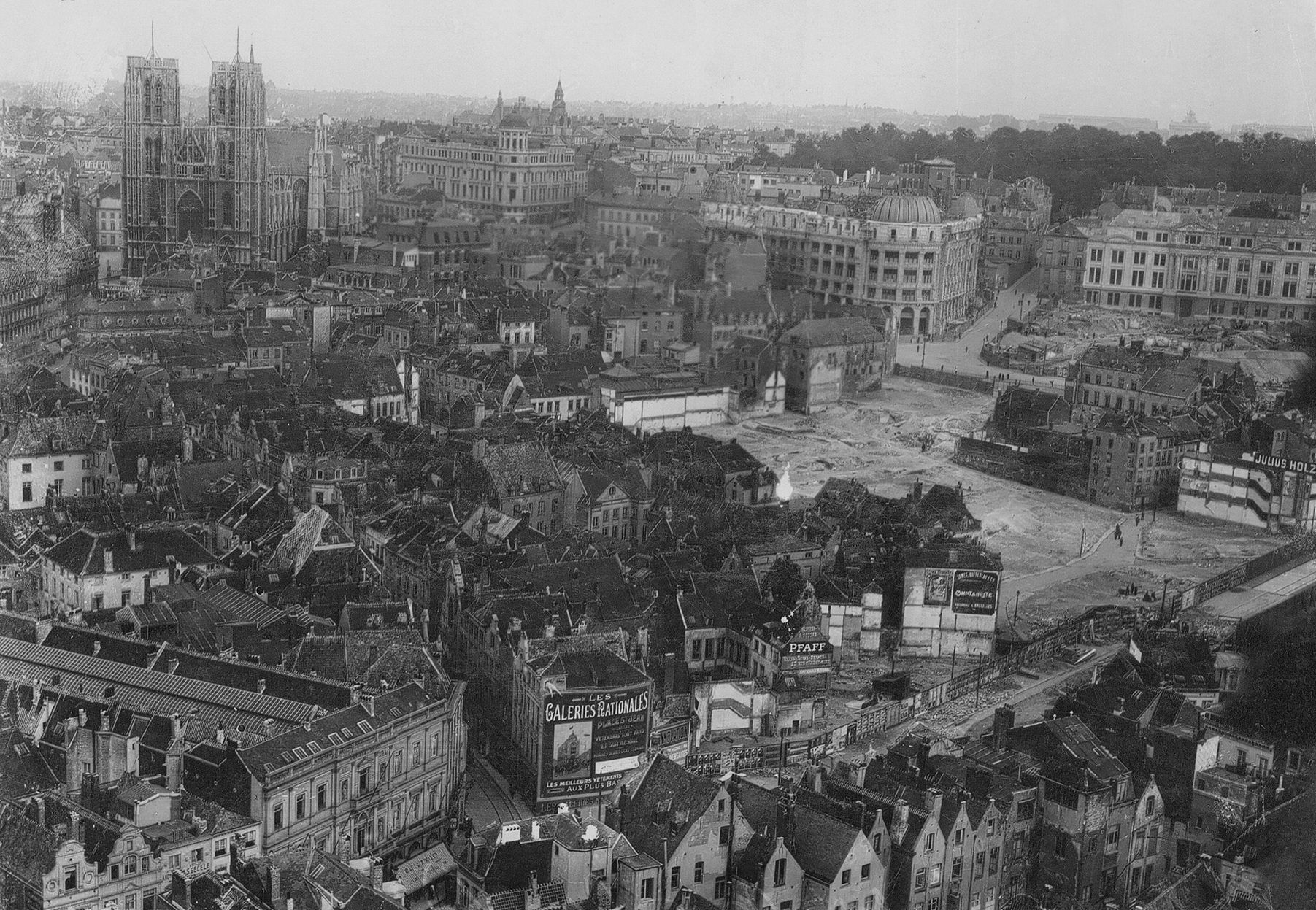
View of the Putterie/Putterij quarter from the tower of Brussels' Town Hall, c. 1912

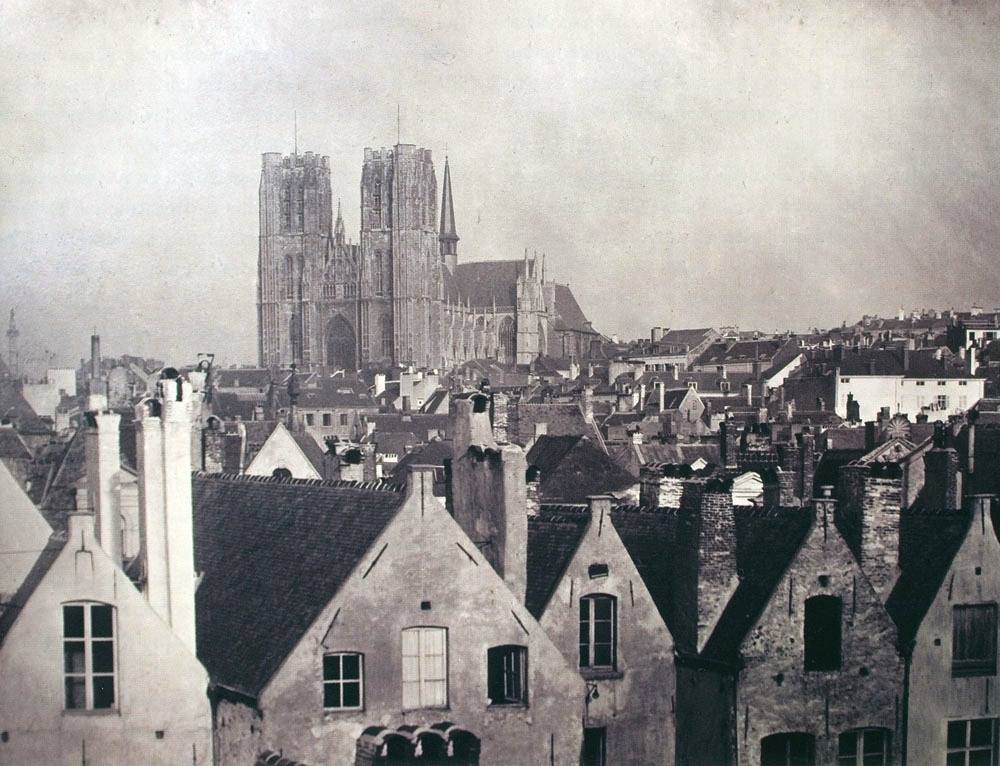
Another view of the neighbourhood prior to its demolition

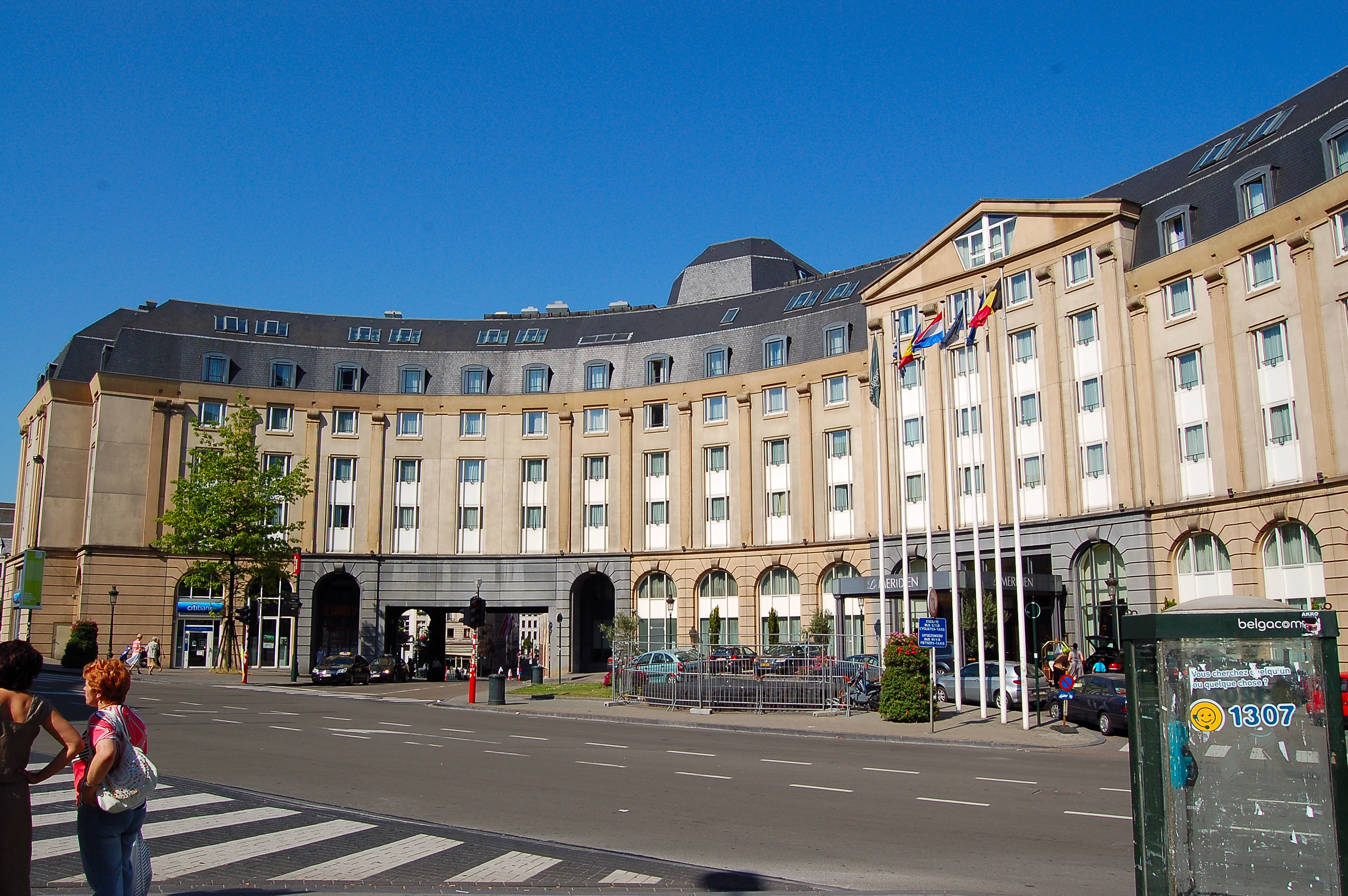
Carrefour de l'Europe and hotel, constructed in the 1980s in the New Classical style to give back a more historic urban appearance to the area

== See also ==
- Neighbourhoods in Brussels
- Granvelle Palace, a demolished palace in the district
- Brusselisation
- History of Brussels
- Belgium in the long nineteenth century
