= INTBAU =

International organization

- Formation: 2001; 25 years ago
- Founders: Charles III
- Legal status: Nonprofit organization
- Headquarters: The King's Foundation, London, UK
- Patron: Charles III
- Executive Director: Harriet Wennberg
- Website: www.intbau.org

The International Network for Traditional Building, Architecture & Urbanism (INTBAU) is a worldwide organization established in 2002, dedicated to the support of traditional building, the maintenance of local character and the creation of better places to live.

The organization arose from a research project initiated in 2000 at The Prince's Foundation for the Built Environment and undertaken by Dr Matthew Hardy, an architect and architectural historian, and architect Robert Adam. It has a Central Office located with three related charities in The Prince's Foundation for the Built Environment building in Shoreditch, London, United Kingdom.

== History ==
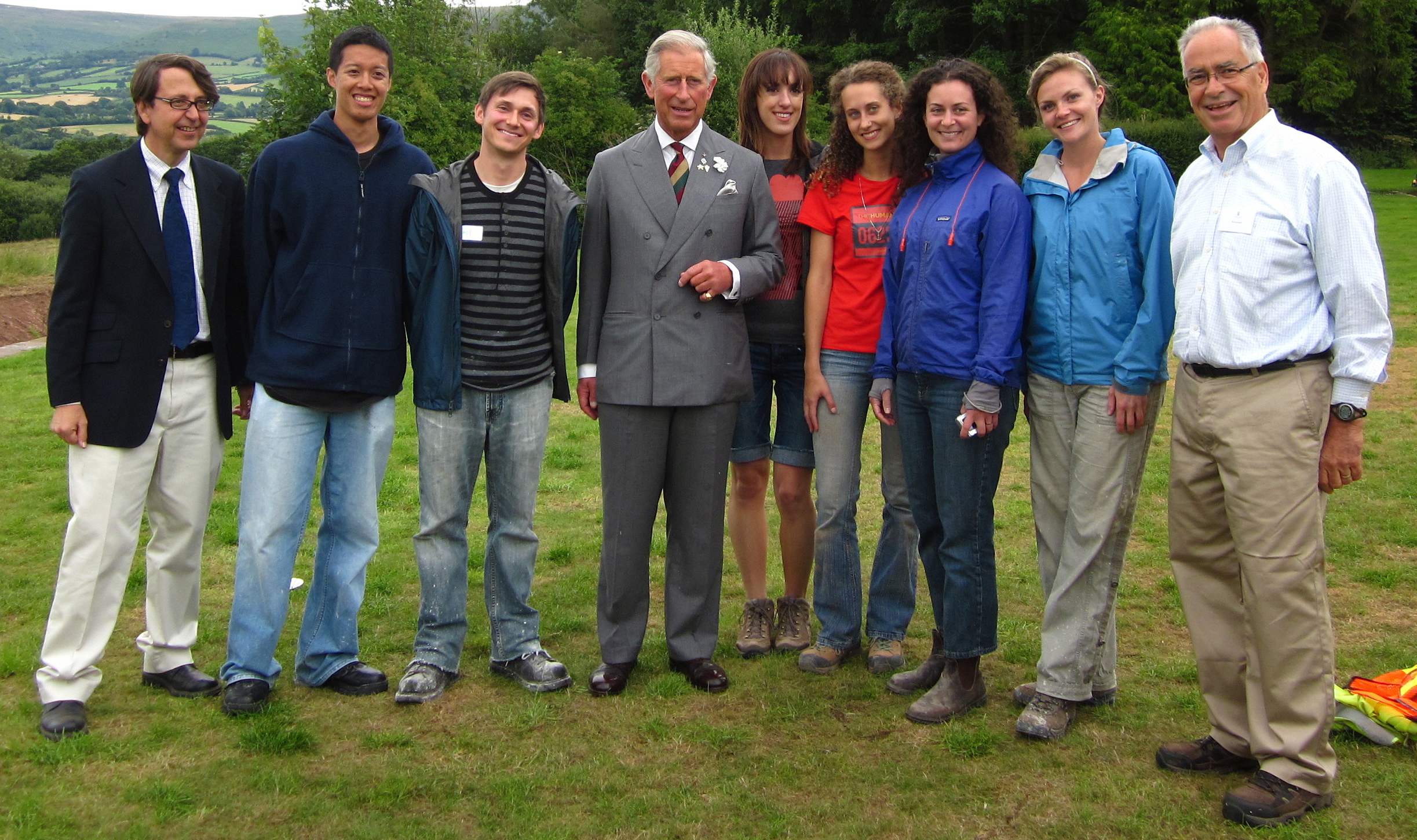
Charles III with INTBAU members in 2010.

INTBAU originated in a research project initiated in 2000 by the Prince's Foundation for the Built Environment (now The King's Foundation) to establish an international network for traditional architecture and urbanism. Following consultations led by architect Robert Adam and research by Matthew Hardy, the organisation was established in 2001 under the patronage of the then Prince of Wales.

INTBAU was officially launched in January 2002 at the conference Tradition Today: Dead or Alive?, held in London. It subsequently developed into an international network of national chapters (starting in 2003 with Germany and India), bringing together architects, urban designers, craftspeople, academics and supporters of traditional building and urbanism.

Since April 2004 it has been an independent registered educational, first as Charity no. 1103068 and more recently Charity no. 1132362. INTBAU remains under the patronage of the Prince of Wales, though it has now become a subsidiary of The Prince's Foundation.

== Charter ==
INTBAU's work is guided by its charter, the founding document of the organization:

"The International Network for Traditional Building, Architecture & Urbanism is an active network of individuals and institutions dedicated to the creation of humane and harmonious buildings and places which respect local traditions.

Traditions allow us to recognize the lessons of history, enrich our lives and offer our inheritance to the future. Local, regional and national traditions provide the opportunity for communities to retain their individuality with the advance of globalization. Through tradition we can preserve our sense of identity and counteract social alienation. People must have the freedom to maintain their traditions.

Traditional buildings and places maintain a balance with nature and society that has been developed over many generations. They enhance our quality of life and are a proper reflection of modern society. Traditional buildings and places can offer a profound modernity beyond novelty and look forward to a better future.

INTBAU brings together those who design, make, maintain, study or enjoy traditional building, architecture and places. We will gain strength, significance and scholarship by association, action and the dissemination of our principles."

== Chapters ==
The organization has chapters (regional sub-groups) in the following countries, as of November 2026: Afghanistan, Albania, Australia, Austria, Belgium, Brazil, Canada, Colombia, Croatia, Cuba, Cyprus, Estonia, Finland, Georgia, Germany, Hungary, India, Iran, Ireland, Italy, Kenya, Levant, Malaysia, Mexico, Morocco, Netherlands, Norway, Pakistan, Philippines, Poland, Portugal, Qatar, Romania, Serbia, Spain, Sweden, Switzerland, Tunisia, Türkiye, UK, Ukraine, USA.

Each chapter signs a "chapter agreement" with the College of Chapters, the central decision-making body of the international organization. Chapters are then free to undertake their own projects subject to an allocation of central office resources and time, approved by the College of Chapters. Projects are generally initiated by Chapters or members and resourced locally in line with the organization's overall environmental and social focus.

== Organisation and governance ==
The UK charitable entity associated with INTBAU is INTBAU Ltd, a company limited by guarantee and registered as a charity in England and Wales (charity number 1132362). Its trustees also serve as directors of the company and are responsible for its governance. The board is required to comprise at least three trustees, appointed by resolution of the existing trustees.

The organisation has a Board of Trustees and an international network of national chapters, which coordinate activities and projects in their respective regions.

== Education ==
INTBAU and its chapters are involved in the organization of a series of educational initiatives that promote traditional methods of designing and building, including:

Programme	Country	Duration
Enduring Design Masterclass	Australia	2 weeks
The Bruges Summer School of Architecture & Crafts	Belgium	5 weeks
Terrachidia Earth Building Workshop	Morocco	10 days
‘Let’s Build a Beautiful City’ Summer School	Netherlands	2 weeks
Pono Village Workshops, Sindh	Pakistan	10 days
Iberian Traditional Architecture Summer School	Spain; Portugal	2 weeks
Summer School of Traditional Architecture and Urbanism of Mexico	Mexico	2 weeks
The Alsace Summer School of Architecture & Crafts	France	2 weeks
Summer School for Architecture Students in Traditional Architecture and Building Techniques	Norway	12 days
INTBAU Finland Summer School in Traditional Architecture	Finland	6 days
INTBAU Qatar's Winter School: Architecture, Ecology & Tradition	Qatar	12 days
The Architecture Of Palladio: Summer School in Classical Architecture and Drawing	Italy	5 days

== Building crafts and skills ==
INTBAU supports initiatives aimed at preserving traditional building crafts and promoting the transmission of practical knowledge between generations. Through its Spanish chapter, it collaborates with the Traditional Building Cultures Foundation on the Spanish Network of Traditional Building Crafts Masters, an online directory documenting craftspeople, traditional techniques, materials and regional building traditions. The network also aims to connect craftspeople with institutions involved in heritage conservation.

In 2022, a Network of Training Centres in Traditional Building Crafts and Heritage Restoration was established in collaboration with INTBAU Spain and the Traditional Building Cultures Foundation to connect institutions providing training in traditional construction techniques and heritage restoration.

In 2026, the Belgian and French chapters of INTBAU started to establish a new, permanent school for traditional crafts and architecture in Westhoffen, Alsace.

Other initiatives include the Richard H. Driehaus Building Arts Awards, presented since 2017 to recognise outstanding masters of traditional building trades, and the Donald Gray Grants for Building Arts, which support practical apprenticeships with experienced craftspeople, helping to transmit traditional skills to a new generation.

== ICTP ==
INTBAU operates the INTBAU College of Traditional Practitioners (ICTP), a peer-reviewed professional organization for architects, artists, academics and others working in traditional styles. Members must have produced at least 5 years of work of the "highest standard" and pass an entry examination by portfolio. There are currently 50 members of the ICTP.

== Awards and competitions ==
Through its Spanish chapter, INTBAU collaborates with the Traditional Building Cultures Foundation on several international awards and competitions.

The Rafael Manzano Prize for New Traditional Architecture, established in 2012, recognises architects whose work contributes to the continuation of traditional architecture in Spain and Portugal, including the restoration of architectural heritage and the construction of new buildings based on local traditions.

The Richard H. Driehaus Architecture Competition, established in 2016, invites Spanish municipalities to propose sites for architectural and urban design projects. In its international second phase, architects are invited to submit proposals that continue local building traditions and contribute to the conservation of built heritage.

Another collaborative initiative is the Richard H. Driehaus Heritage Preservation Medal, established in 2019 to recognise individuals and organisations that have made significant contributions to heritage conservation and the continuation of architectural traditions in Spain and Portugal.

== Journal of Traditional Building, Architecture and Urbanism ==
The Journal of Traditional Building, Architecture and Urbanism is a magazine aimed at providing a better knowledge of the traditional constructive cultures of the various regions of the world. It includes original academic articles, peer-review publications and follows all the usual practices of scientific journals. It is organized by the Spanish Chapter of INTBAU, together with the Rafael Manzano Prize through the financial support of the Richard H. Driehaus Charitable Trust, and is a trilingual publication, published in English, Spanish and Portuguese.

== See also ==
- Driehaus Architecture Prize
- Traditional architecture
- Architectural Uprising
