= Architectural Uprising =

Swedish non-profit association

Arkitekturupproret
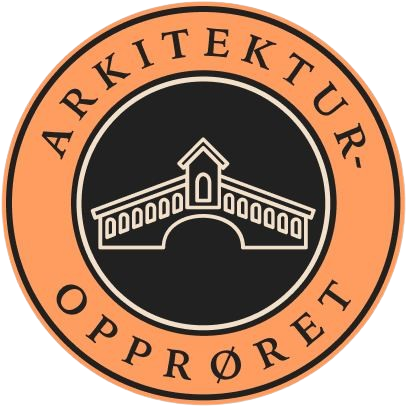
- Formation: 2016; 9 years ago
- Founders: Michael Diamant
- Legal status: Nonprofit organization
- Headquarters: Stockholm, Sweden
- President: Sigvald Freylander
- Vice-Chairman: Eric Norin
- Website: www.architecturaluprising.com

Architectural Uprising, founded as Arkitekturupproret is a Swedish non-profit association and think tank which was founded in September 2016. It defends classical architecture while simultaneously contesting modern architecture, deeming modern buildings unprepossessing. Initially founded as a digital group in 2014, it became an association two years later. Described by Bloomberg as a "significant platform and voice in the design of built environments", it is an independent organization. Its work is analogous to that carried out in the United States by the ICAA.

== Chapters ==
The Architectural Uprising has chapters in Brazil, Denmark, Estonia, Finland, Germany, Romania, India, Ireland, Israel, Italy, the Netherlands, Norway, Poland, Spain, Syria, Ukraine and other countries, as well as several groups for regions and cities like Amsterdam, Berlin, Copenhagen, Oslo and Stockholm, and one for the western United States.

== Kasper Kalkon Award ==
Since 2016, the association has been awarding the Kasper Kalkon prize^{(sv)}. The name Kasper Kalkon ironically alludes to Sweden's Architects' main prize, the Kasper Salin Prize, and every year the AU holds a Turkey Gala as the equivalent of the Kasper Salin Gala, where, among other awards, prizes for Sweden's ugliest and most beautiful new buildings are awarded.

The Kasper Kalkon prize for Sweden's ugliest newly built house was inspired by the British Carbuncle Cup, which was instituted in 2006 after a statement by Charles III (then Prince of Wales) that a modernist addition to the National Gallery in London resembled "a boil [carbuncle] on the face of a dear old friend". The Kasper Kalkon prize was awarded for the first time in November 2016. The winner, who was chosen by public vote, was Segerstedthuset in Uppsala. AU also subsequently appointed winners for each year throughout the 2010s.

== Concept of fake view ==
The Architecture Uprising coined the term "fake view", which means that digital vision images of planned buildings are created in a way that is impossible to realize, which in turn leads to the real building looking completely different from what the vision image predicted. In connection with the Kasper Kalkon award, the AU usually also awards a prize to "the most lying fake view of the year", which is sometimes chosen by vote and sometimes appointed by the AU's working group.

In 2021, the new Växjö municipal building by architect White Arkitekter won the prize for the most lying fake view of the year.

The winner in 2022 was the Platinan conference house in Gothenburg, designed by Erik Giudice.

== See also ==
- Classical order
- Classical architecture
- Traditional architecture
- New Classical architecture
