= New Classical architecture =

Postmodern classical architectural movement

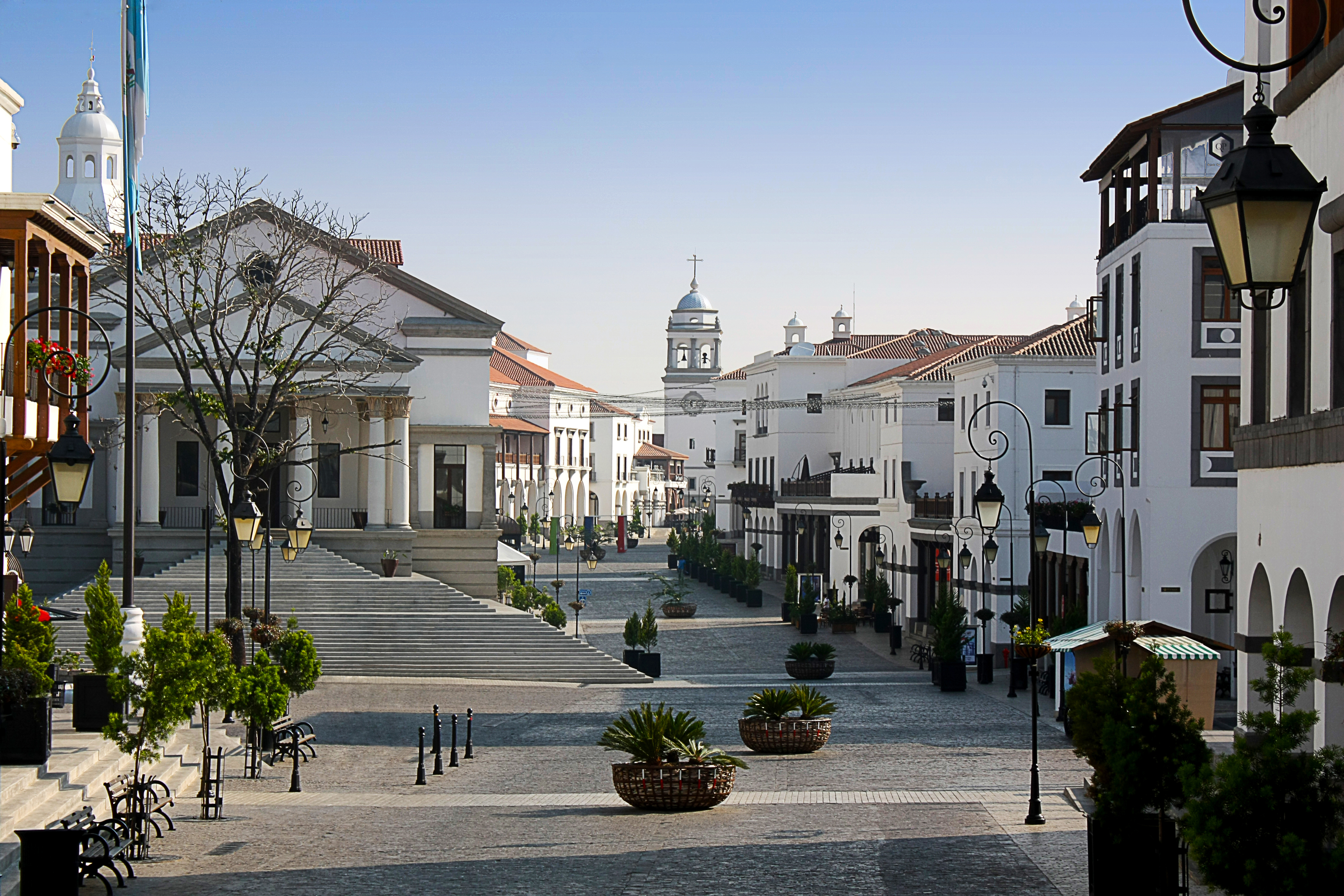
Ciudad Cayalá in Guatemala City, Guatemala, 2011, by Léon Krier

New Classical architecture, also known as New Classicism or Contemporary Classical architecture, is a contemporary movement that builds upon the principles of Classical architecture. It is sometimes considered the modern continuation of neoclassical architecture, even though other styles might be cited as well, such as Gothic, Baroque, Renaissance or even non-Western styles – often referenced and recreated from a postmodern perspective rather than as strict revivals.

The design and construction of buildings in evolving classical styles continued throughout the 20th and 21st centuries, even as modernist and other non-classical theories broke with the classical language of architecture. The New Classical movement is also tied to a resurgence in new traditional architecture, which emphasizes craftsmanship rooted in local building traditions and materials.

== Development ==
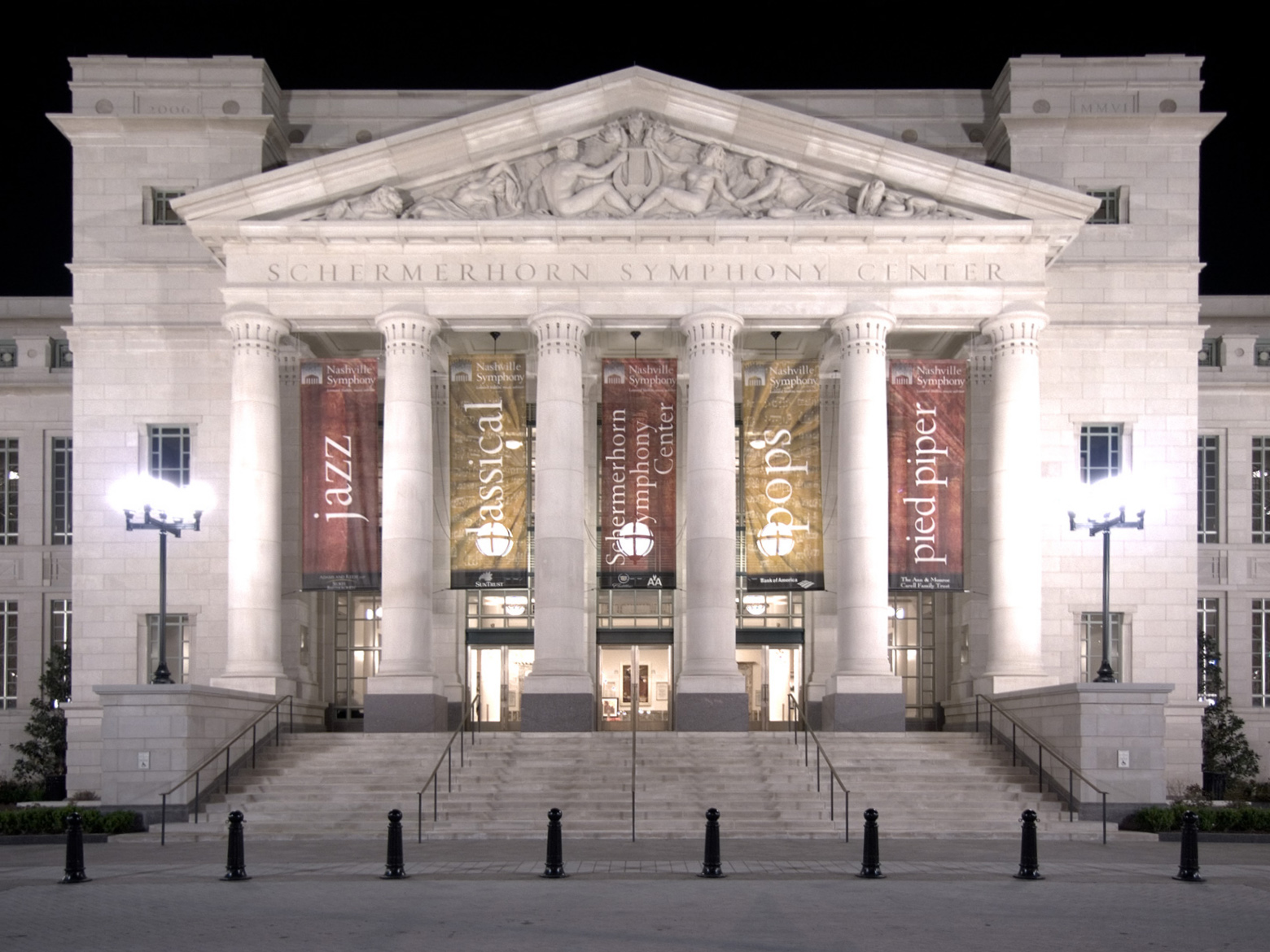
Schermerhorn Symphony Center in Nashville, Tennessee, opened in 2006

During the 1950s and 1960s, a small group of architects in Europe continued designing classical buildings contrary to the prevailing fashion for Modernist architecture. British architects Donald McMorran, who designed several noteworthy neoclassical buildings such as the Cripps Hall at the University of Nottingham and described the Modernist movement as "a dictatorship of taste", and Raymond Erith, who mentored New Classical architect Quinlan Terry – Erith's pupil, employee, partner, and ultimately successor – were notable for their neoclassical works, including numerous civic buildings and housing estates. In mainland Europe, François Spoerry contributed to the European Urban Renaissance with his classical designs and by the late 1970s, architects like Leon Krier and Maurice Culot began challenging modernist planning through publications and counter-projects, a movement further bolstered by the support of King Charles III (then Prince of Wales) and initiatives such as INTBAU or The Prince's Foundation for Building Community. and, later, Create Streets.

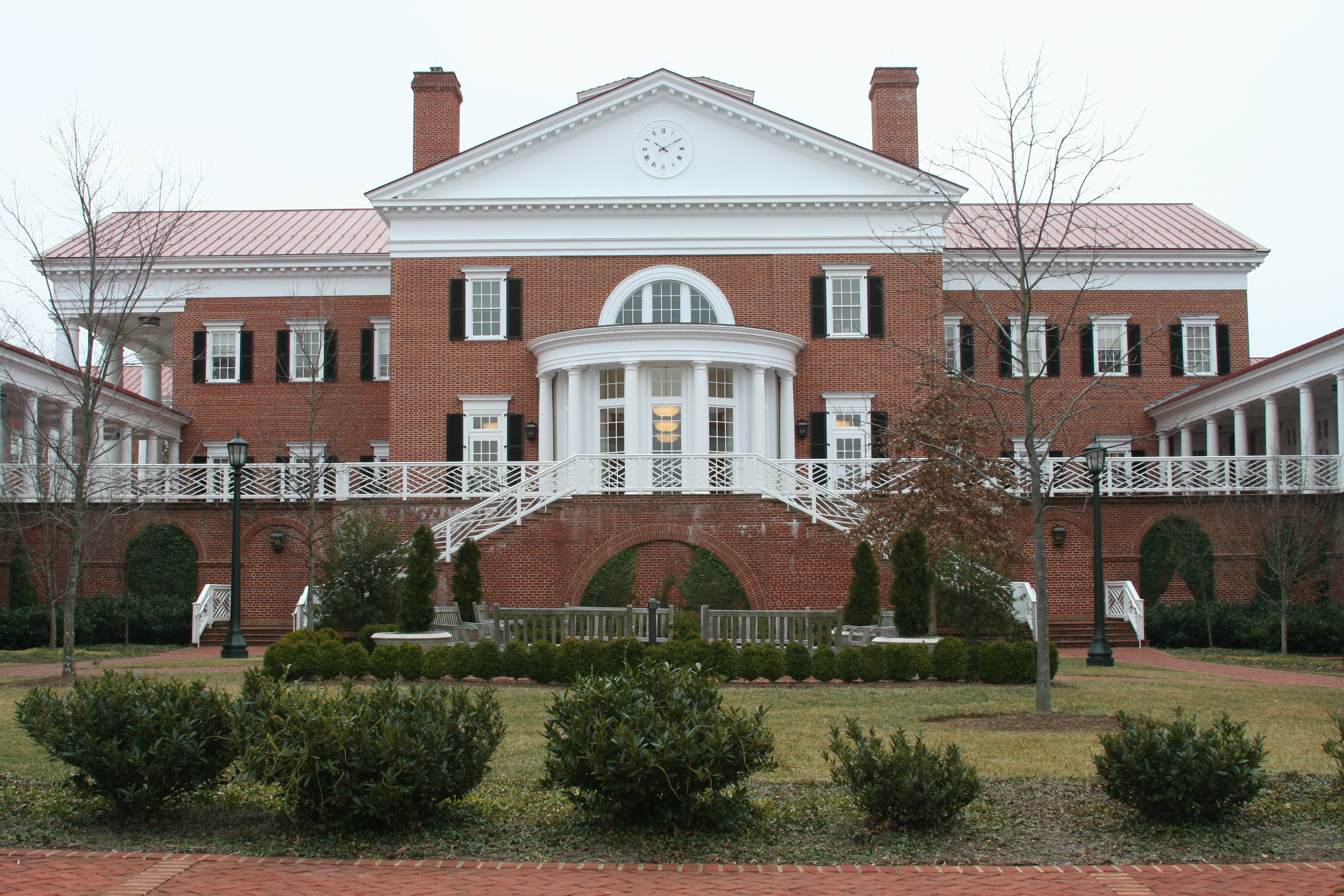
Darden Graduate School of Business Administration at the University of Virginia, 1992, by Robert A.M. Stern Architects

During the same period, postmodern architecture emerged as a critique to modernist architectural aesthetics. Influential architects inside this movement, such as Charles Moore, Robert Venturi, and Michael Graves used classical elements as ironic motifs to criticize modernism's sterility. A broad spectrum of more than two dozen architects, theorists, and historians also presented alternatives to modernism and among them were several serious New Classical architects who viewed classicism as a legitimate mode of architectural expression, some of whom would later become Driehaus Prize Laureates, including figures like Thomas Beeby and Robert A.M. Stern, who practiced both postmodern and classical styles. Some postmodernist firms, such as Stern and Albert, Righter, & Tittman, outright transitioned from postmodern design to new interpretations of traditional architecture.

On the education front, Thomas Gordon Smith, a Rome Prize laureate from the American Academy in Rome, published Classical Architecture: Rule and Invention in 1988 and was appointed to chair the University of Notre Dame's Department of Architecture a year later, structuring the curriculum around classical and traditional building practices. Today, programs that teach New Classical Architecture are offered at the University of Miami, Judson University, Andrews University and the Center for Advanced Research in Traditional Architecture in Traditional Architecture at the University of Colorado Denver.

The New Classical movement continues to develop at the professional and popular level, gaining momentum after the 1963 demolition of McKim, Mead & White's Pennsylvania Railroad Station in New York City, which led to the formation of Classical America. Led by Henry Hope Reed, Jr., which advocated for the appreciation of classical architecture by teaching architects the classical orders and hosting various events and conferences. In 2002, the Institute of Classical Architecture merged with Classical America to form The Institute of Classical Architecture and Art, which supports regional chapters in the United States that host awards programs, publishes the peer-reviewed journal The Classicist, and offers educational programs for professionals and the public. The international expansion of the movement was catalyzed by the creation of the International Network for Traditional Building, Architecture & Urbanism in 2001, a global organization under the patronage of King Charles III, focused on supporting traditional architecture and preserving local character.

In 2003, philanthropist Richard H. Driehaus established the Driehaus Architecture Prize, awarded by the University of Notre Dame School of Architecture, to honor architects whose work embodies classical and traditional principles in architecture and urbanism, seen as the alternative to the modernist Pritzker Prize, but with double the cash prize. It is awarded alongside the Reed Award which recognizes individuals outside architecture who support traditional city design through writing, planning, or promotion. Other notable classical architecture awards include the American Palladio Award, the European Prize Philippe Rotthier, the Iberian Rafael Manzano Prize, the Edmund N. Bacon Prize, and the Rieger Graham Prize of The Institute of Classical Architecture and Art for architecture graduates.

Since 2014, movements such as the Architectural Uprising, founded in Sweden, have advocated for traditional designs in new developments. Originally a Facebook group, it has expanded to other Nordic countries and the rest of the world, achieving moderate success in promoting traditional architecture. The movement's main goal is to "make architecture available to everyone" through social media and annual awards recognizing the best and worst new buildings in Sweden.

Since the early 2020s, other groups such as Traditional Architecture Group, part of the Royal Institute of British Architects and 'The Nordic Symposium on Beauty in Architecture have gained prominence as the annual event for classical architecture. Since 2021, efforts to reintroduce New Classical architecture into urban planning were furthered in the U.S. by architect Nir Buras, who founded the Classic Planning Institute (CPI). Based in Washington, D.C., the CPI focuses on research, practice, and education to incorporate New Classical principles into contemporary urban planning. The CPI also hosts the Traditional Architecture Gathering (TAG), an international conference that attracts hundred of architects and enthusiasts to discuss New Classical Architecture worldwide. As of 2025, Architectural Place, the first pro-classical international order started operating, whilst curating a monthly cover dedicated to classical design and personalities. Carrying forward the work established by Traditional Building, it is as of 2026 the leading classical publication.

== Philosophy ==
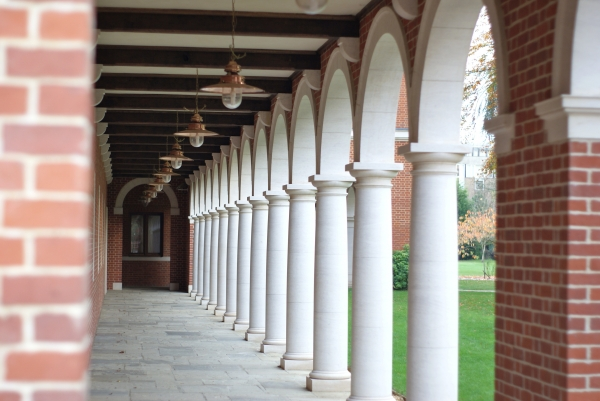
Ann's Court, Selwyn College, Cambridge, by Porphyrios Associates

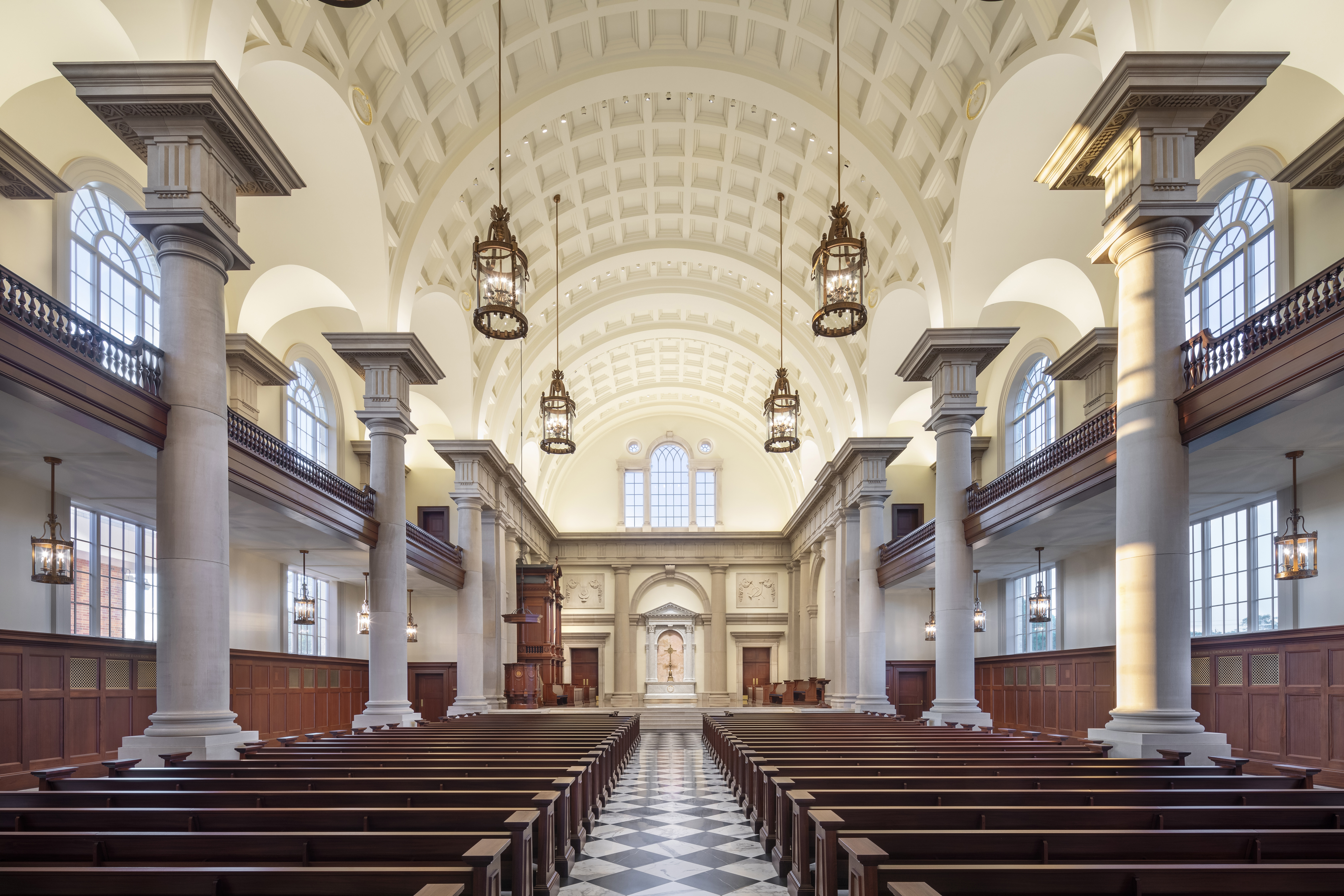
Hillsdale Chapel, Hillsdale College, by Duncan G. Stroik

New Classical professionals tend to work under the assumption that there is no such thing as purely original creation, and that innovation unavoidably occurs in an environment laden with suggestions, influences, a precedent of problems solved and, perhaps more importantly, mistakes to be avoided.

Many New Classical architects believe in the importance of sustainability, and aim to create long-lasting, well-crafted buildings of great quality, adapted to the context and with an efficient use of natural resources.

== Educational institutions ==
While most universities worldwide teach modernist design principles, some institutions teach (solely, mainly, or partly) the principles of traditional and classical architecture and urban planning. Some of these are:

Brazil

- Centro Universitário Euroamericano (UNIEURO), in Brasília.

India

- Tirumala S.V. Institute of Traditional Sculpture and Architecture (SVITSA), in Tirupati, Andhra Pradesh.

Italy

- Polytechnic University of Bari, in Bari.

New Zealand

- Unitec Institute of Technology, in Auckland.

United Kingdom

- National Design Academy, in Nottingham (heritage interior design).
- The King's Foundation, in London.
- The King's Foundation School of Traditional Arts, in London.
- Unit 6 of the Kingston School of Art's Master of Architecture program, the only postgraduate unit in the United Kingdom to teach classical design. Previously, this was taught in the undergraduate program.
- University of Portsmouth, in Portsmouth, School of Architecture.
- PRASADA – Practice, Research, and Advancement in South Asian Design and Architecture at Welsh School of Architecture, Cardiff University, in Cardiff, Wales.

United States

- Andrews University, in Berrien Springs, Michigan.
- American College of the Building Arts. and School of the Arts at College of Charleston, in Charleston, South Carolina.
- The Center for Advanced Research in Traditional Architecture at the University of Colorado, in Denver, Colorado.
- University of Miami, in Coral Gables, Florida.
- Yale School of Architecture, in New Haven, Connecticut.
- Grand Central Academy of Art formerly hosted at the Institute of Classical Architecture & Art, in New York City.
- Institute of Classical Architecture & Art, in New York City.
- University of Notre Dame School of Architecture, in Notre Dame, Indiana.
- Utah Valley University, in Orem, Utah.
- Beaux-Arts Academy, in Salt Lake City, Utah.
- Academy of Classical Design, in Southern Pines, North Carolina.
- The Classic Planning Institute, Washington D.C.

== Examples ==
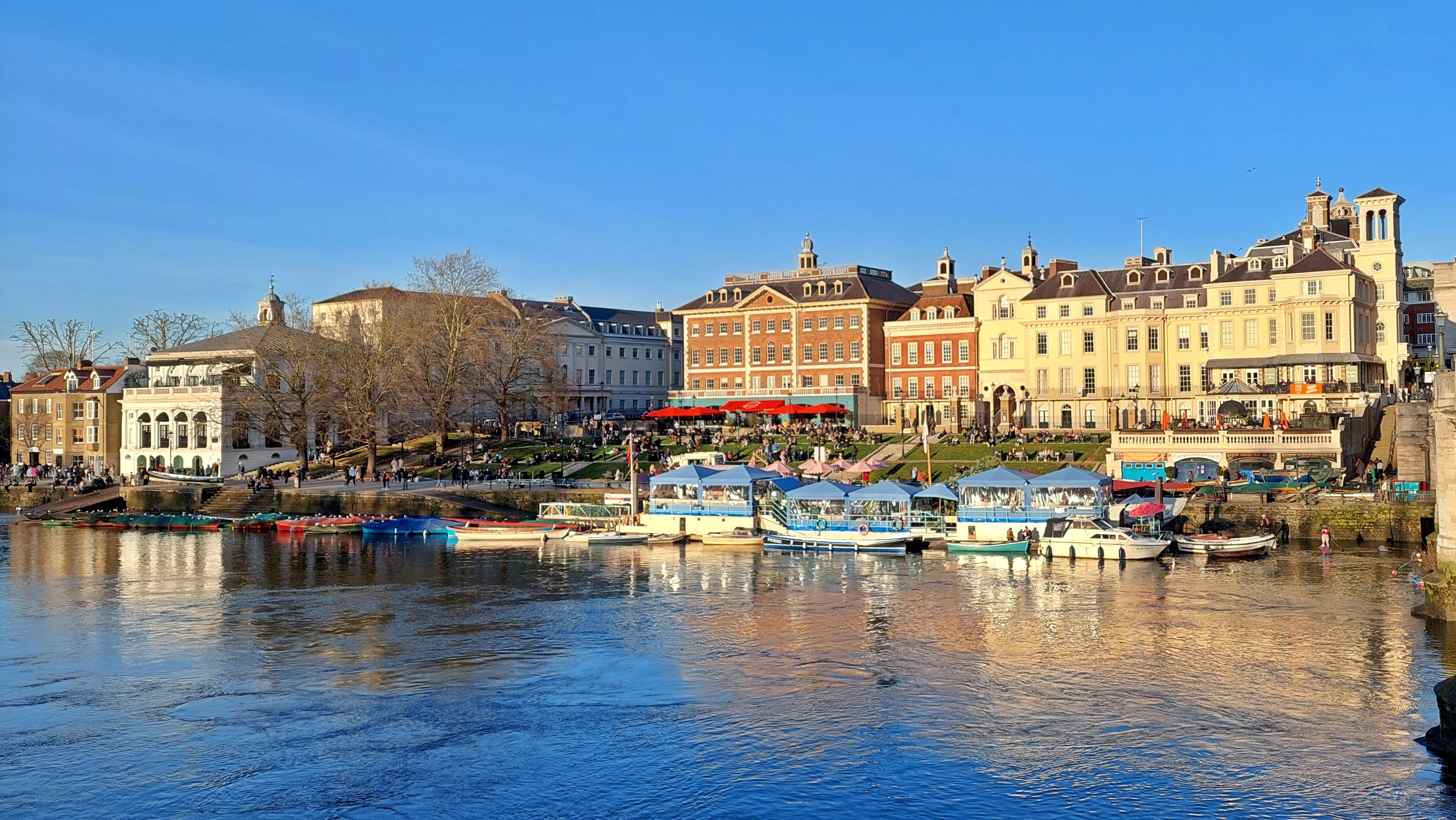
Richmond Riverside, Richmond, England, 1988, by Quinlan Terry

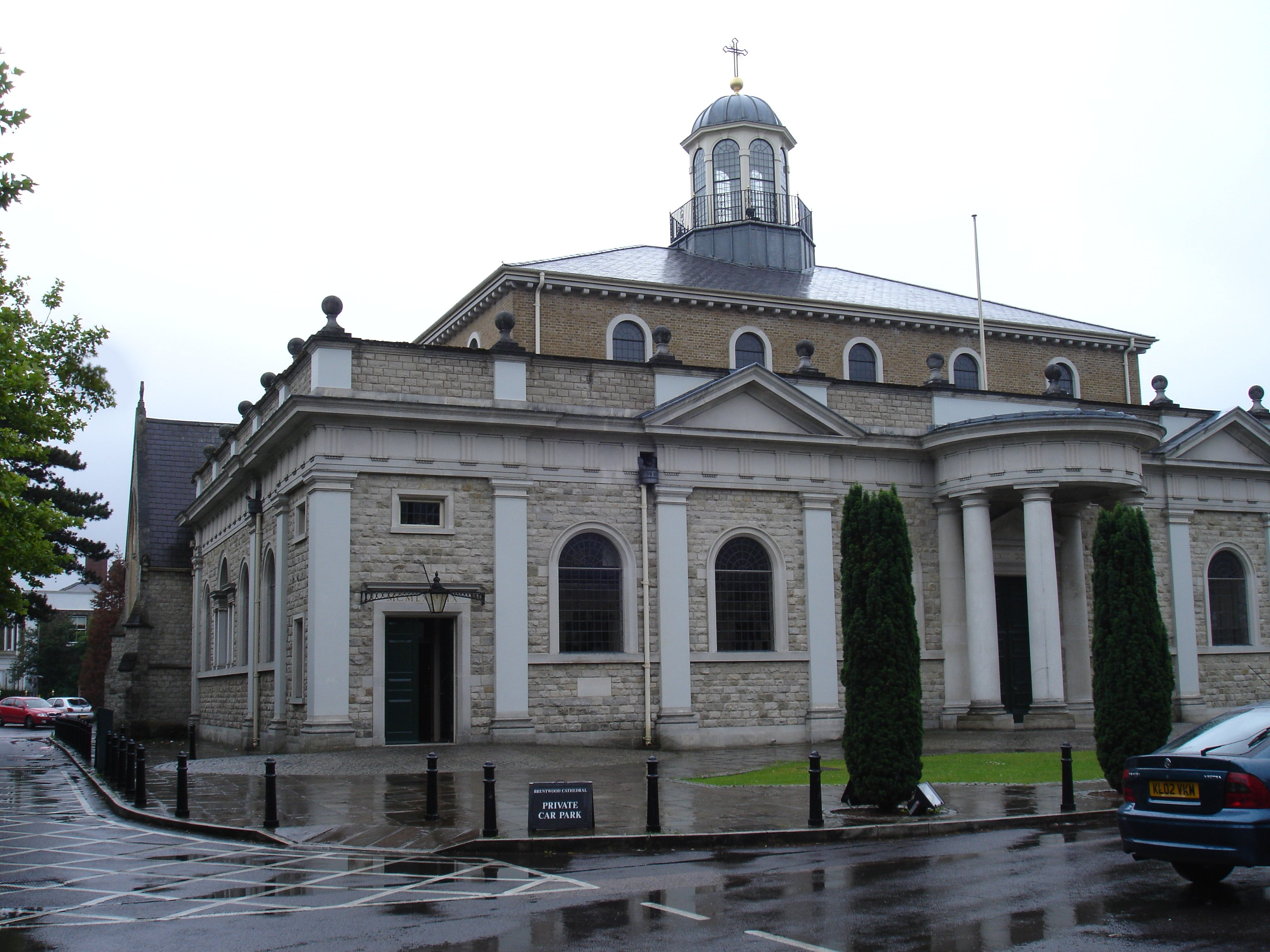
Brentwood Cathedral, Brentwood, England, 1991, by Quinlan Terry

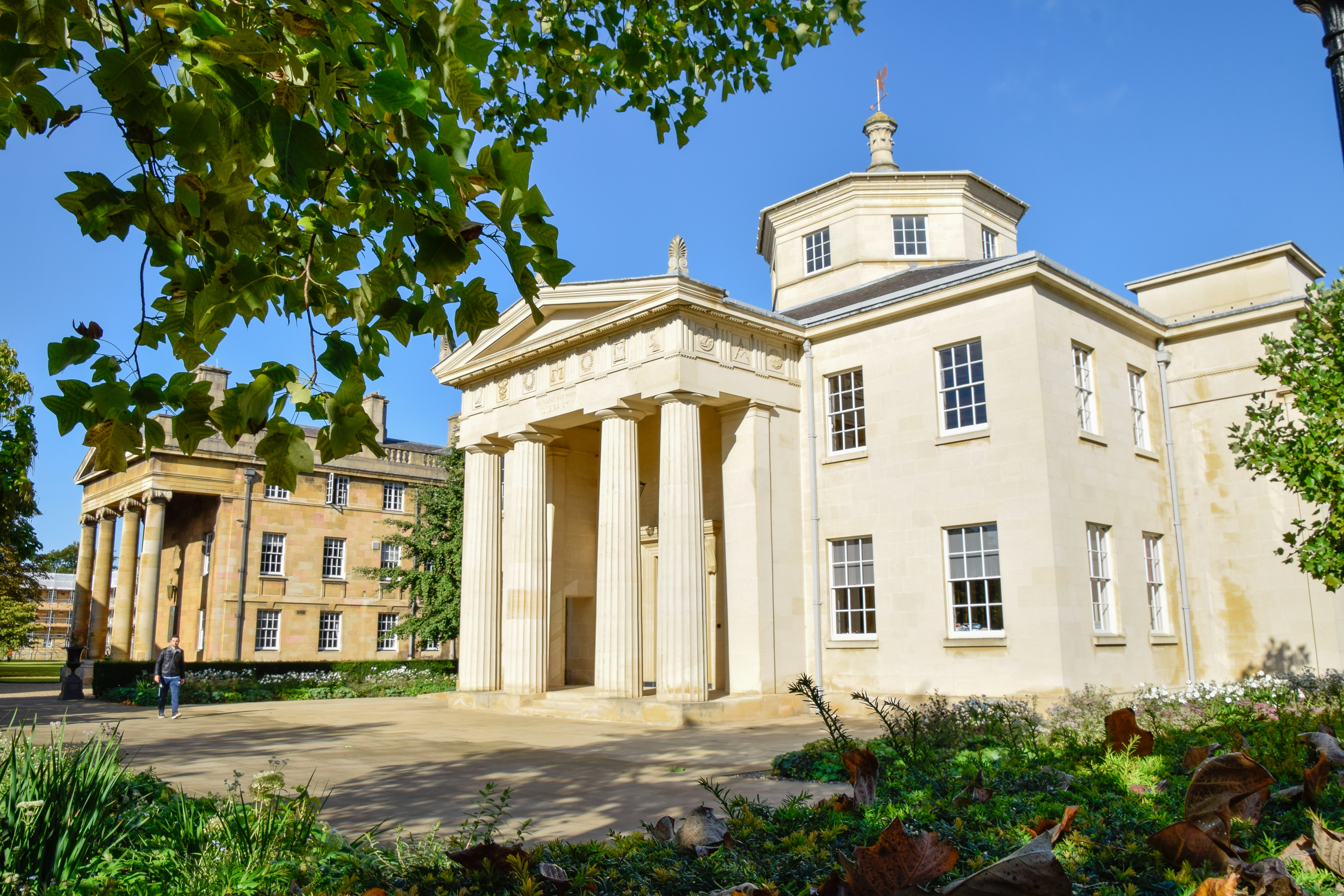
Maitland Robinson Library, Cambridge, England, 1992, by Quinlan Terry

Poundbury, England, 1993, by Léon Krier

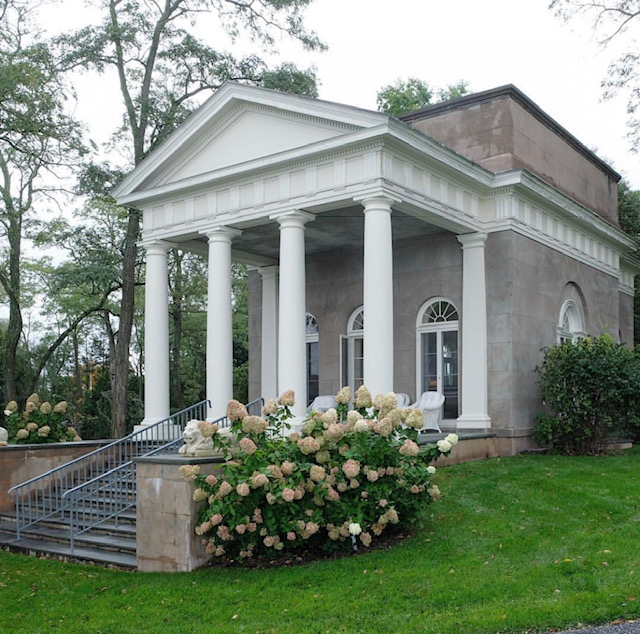
Garden Pavilion at Edgewater, Barrytown, New York, 1997, by Michael Dwyer

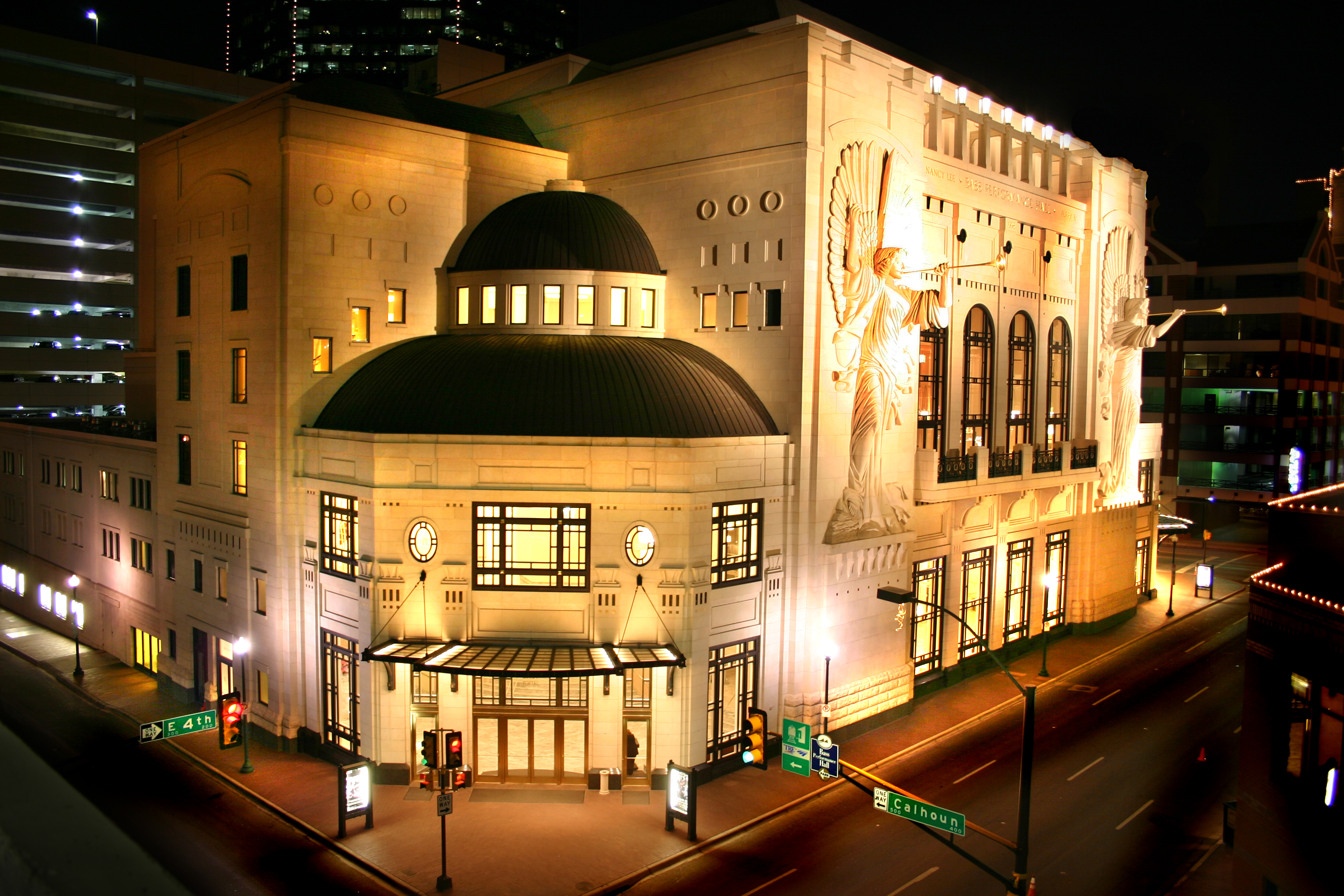
Nancy Lee and Perry R. Bass Performance Hall, Fort Worth, Texas, 1998, by David M. Schwarz

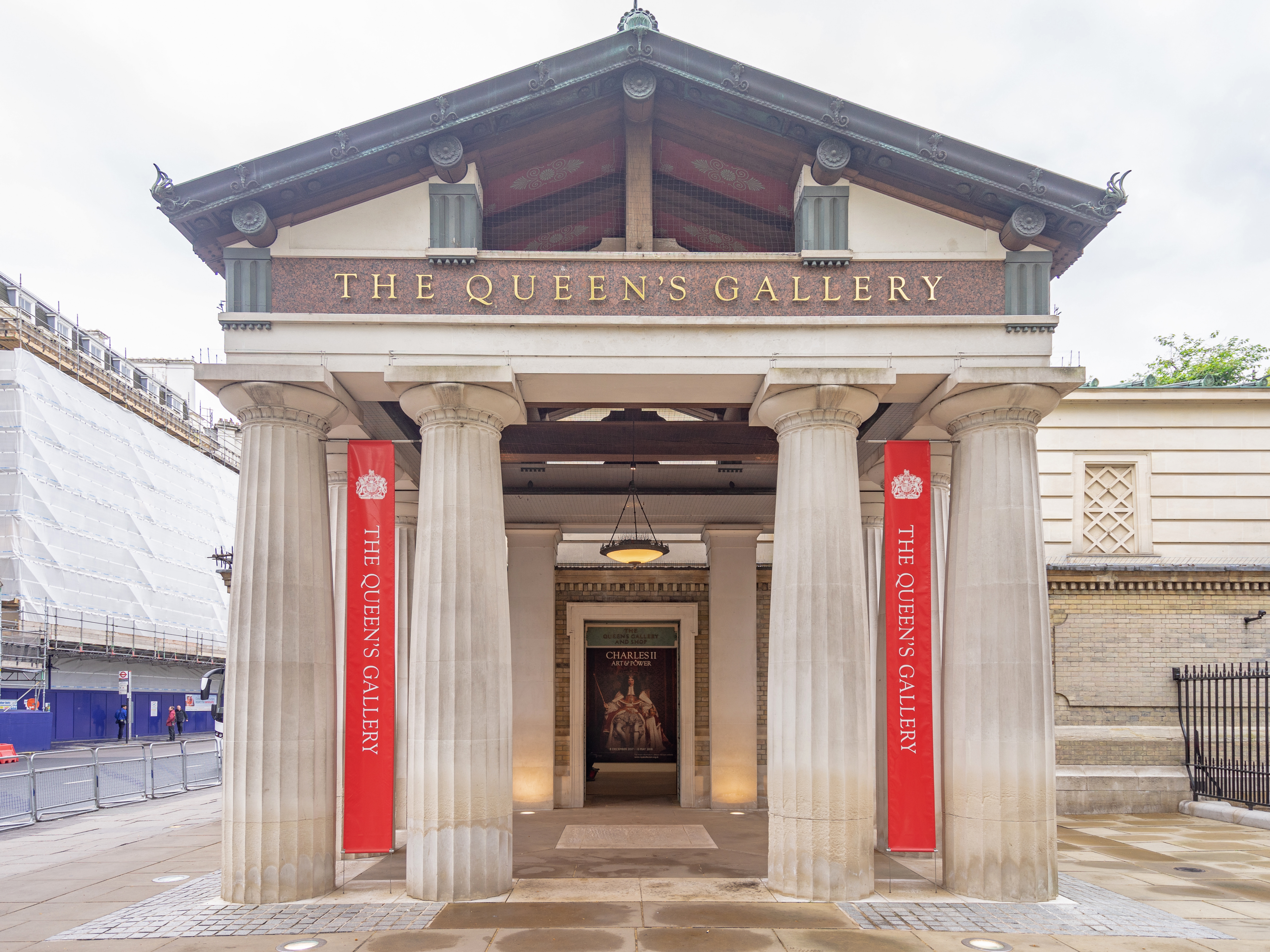
King's Gallery (formerly known as the Queen's Gallery), London, England, 2002, by John Simpson

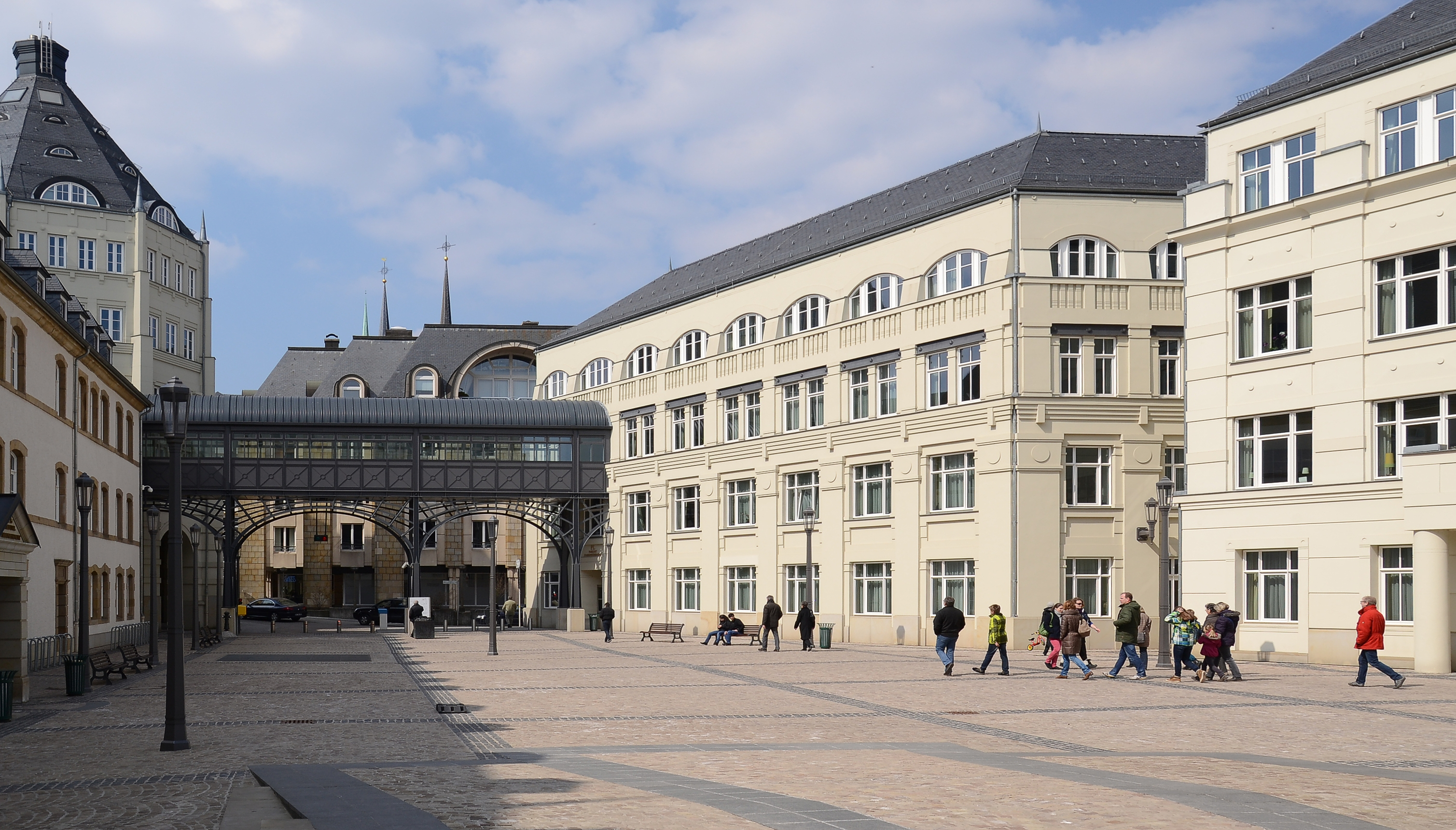
Judiciary City, Luxembourg City, Luxembourg, 2008, by Rob Krier

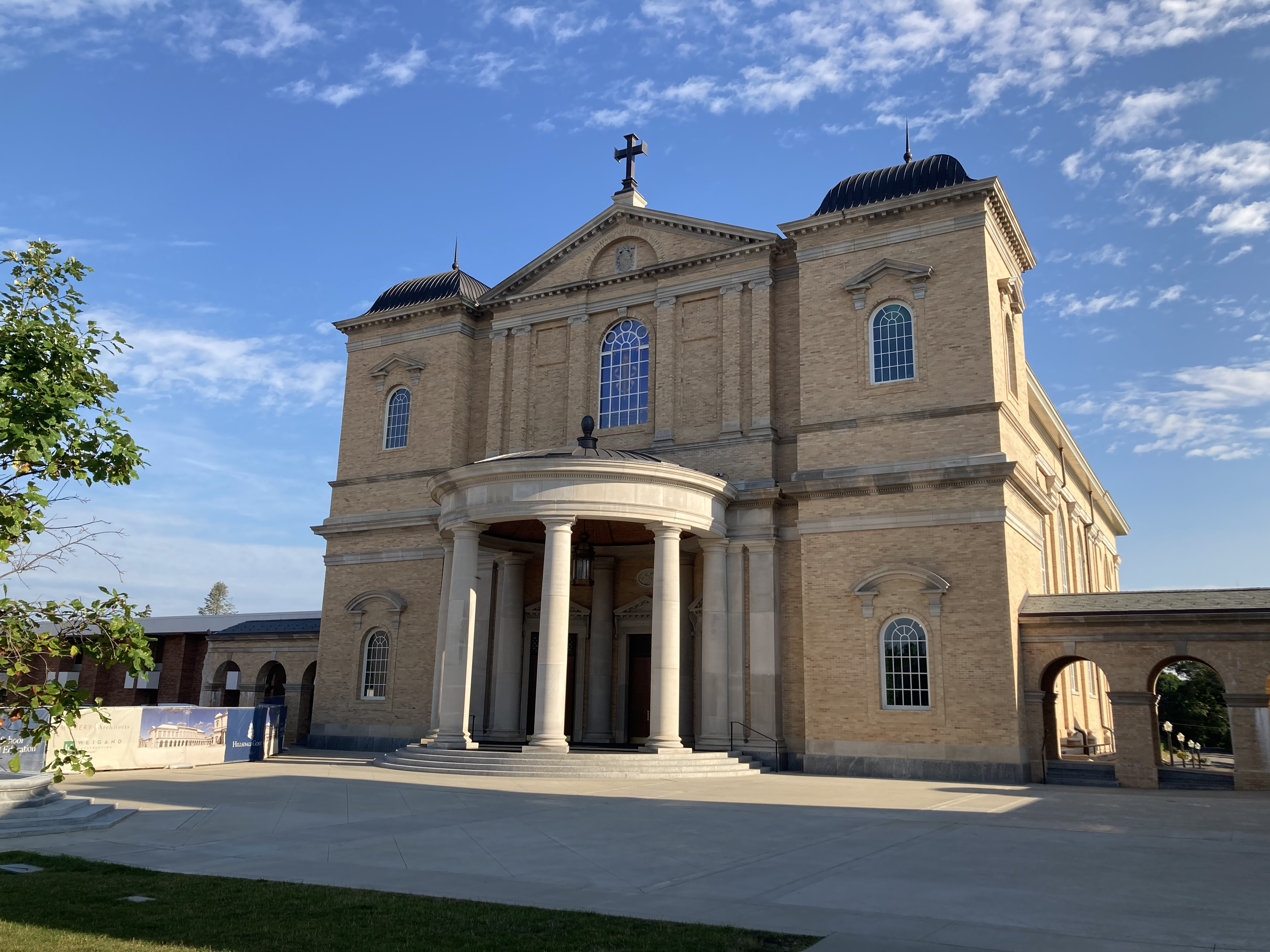
Christ Chapel, Hillsdale, Michigan, 2019, by Duncan G. Stroik

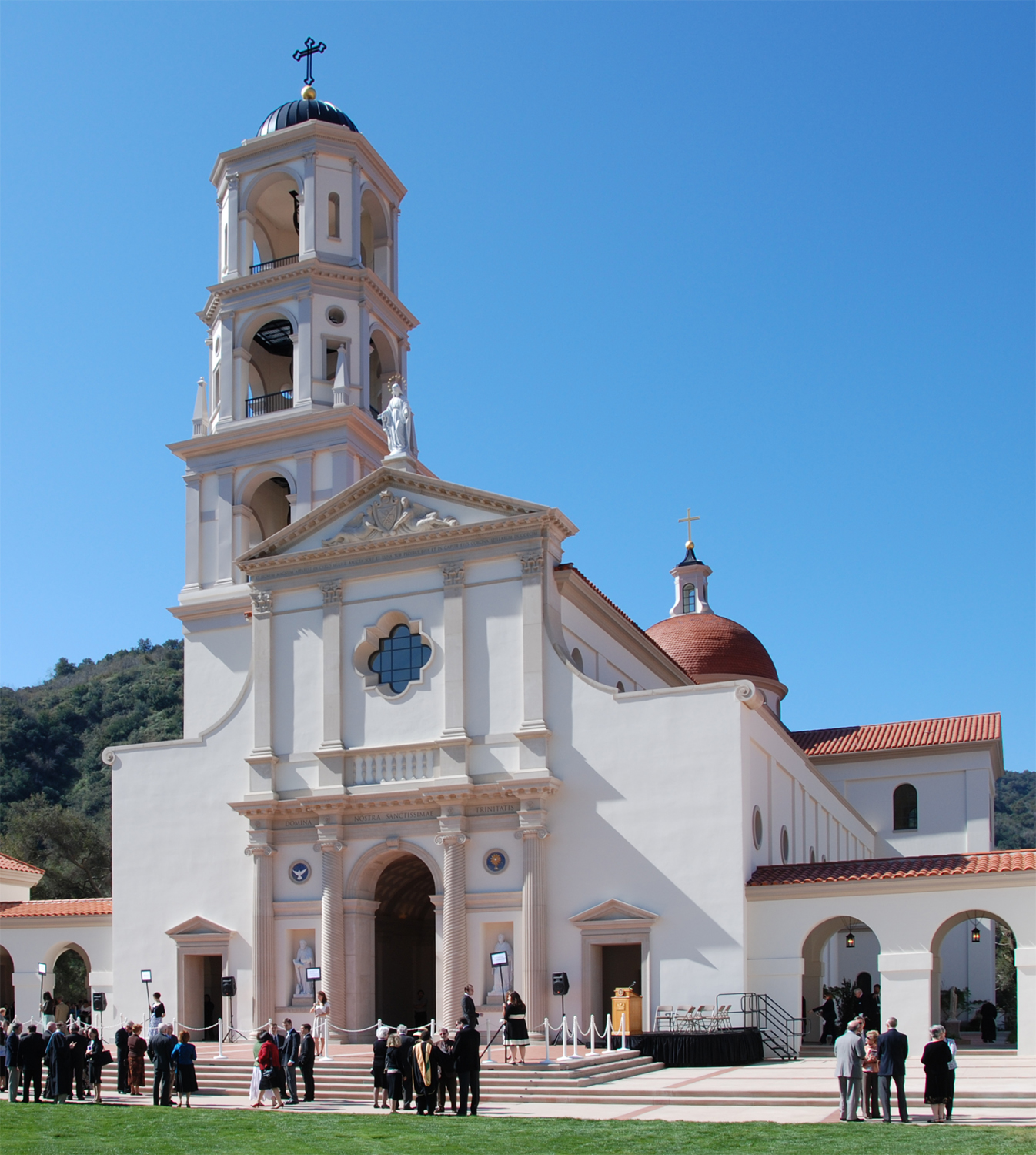
Chapel at Thomas Aquinas College, Santa Paula, California, 2009, by Duncan Stroik

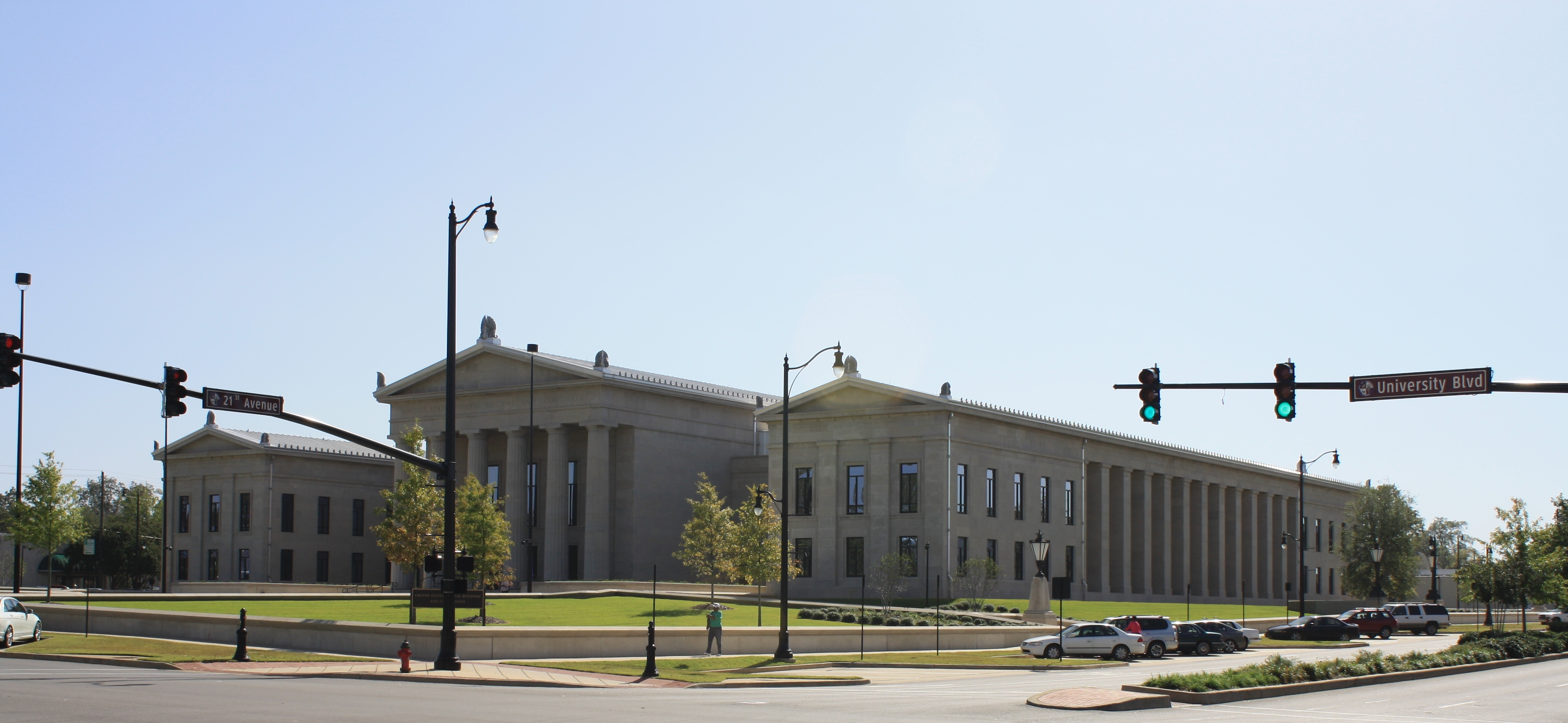
United States Federal Building and Courthouse, Tuscaloosa, Alabama, 2011, by Hammond Beeby Rupert Ainge

== See also ==
- Classical Realism
- Traditional architecture
- Driehaus Architecture Prize
- Outline of classical architecture
- Revivalism (architecture)
- Vernacular architecture

== Bibliography ==
- Alexander, Christopher (1979). The Timeless Way of Building. Oxford University Press. ISBN 978-0-19-502402-9.
- Charles, Prince of Wales (1989). A Vision of Britain: A Personal View of Architecture. Doubleday. ISBN 978-0-385-26903-2.
- Coles, William A. (1961). Architecture in America: A Battle of Styles. Ardent Media.
- Curl, James Stevens (2003). Classical Architecture: An Introduction to Its Vocabulary and Essentials, with a Select Glossary of Terms. Norton. ISBN 978-0-393-73119-4.
- Dodd, Phillip James (2013). The Art of Classical Details: Theory, Design and Craftsmanship. Images Publishing. ISBN 978-1-86470-203-3.
- Dowling, Elizabeth Meredith (2004). New Classicism: The Rebirth of Traditional Architecture. Random House Incorporated. ISBN 978-0-8478-2660-5.
- Gabriel, J. François (2004). Classical Architecture for the Twenty-first Century: An Introduction to Design. W.W. Norton & Company. ISBN 978-0-393-73076-0.
- Gromort, Georges (2001). The Elements of Classical Architecture. W.W. Norton. ISBN 978-0-393-73051-7.
- Krier, Léon (1985). Albert Speer: architecture, 1932-1942. Archives d'architecture moderne. ISBN 978-2-87143-006-3.
- Matrana, Marc R. (2009). Lost Plantations of the South. Univ. Press of Mississippi. ISBN 978-1-60473-469-0.
- Reed, Henry Hope (1971). The Golden City. W.W. Norton. ISBN 978-0-393-00547-9.
- Scully, Vincent Joseph (1974). The shingle style today: or, The historian's revenge. G. Braziller. ISBN 978-0-8076-0759-6.
- Stroik, Duncan (2012). The Church Building as a Sacred Place: Beauty, Transcendence, and the Eternal. Liturgy Training Publications. ISBN 978-1-59525-037-7.
- Summerson, John (1963). The Classical Language of Architecture. MIT Press. ISBN 978-0-262-69012-6.
- Watkin, David (1977). Morality and Architecture. Clarendon Press. ISBN 978-0-19-817350-2.
