= Traditional architecture =

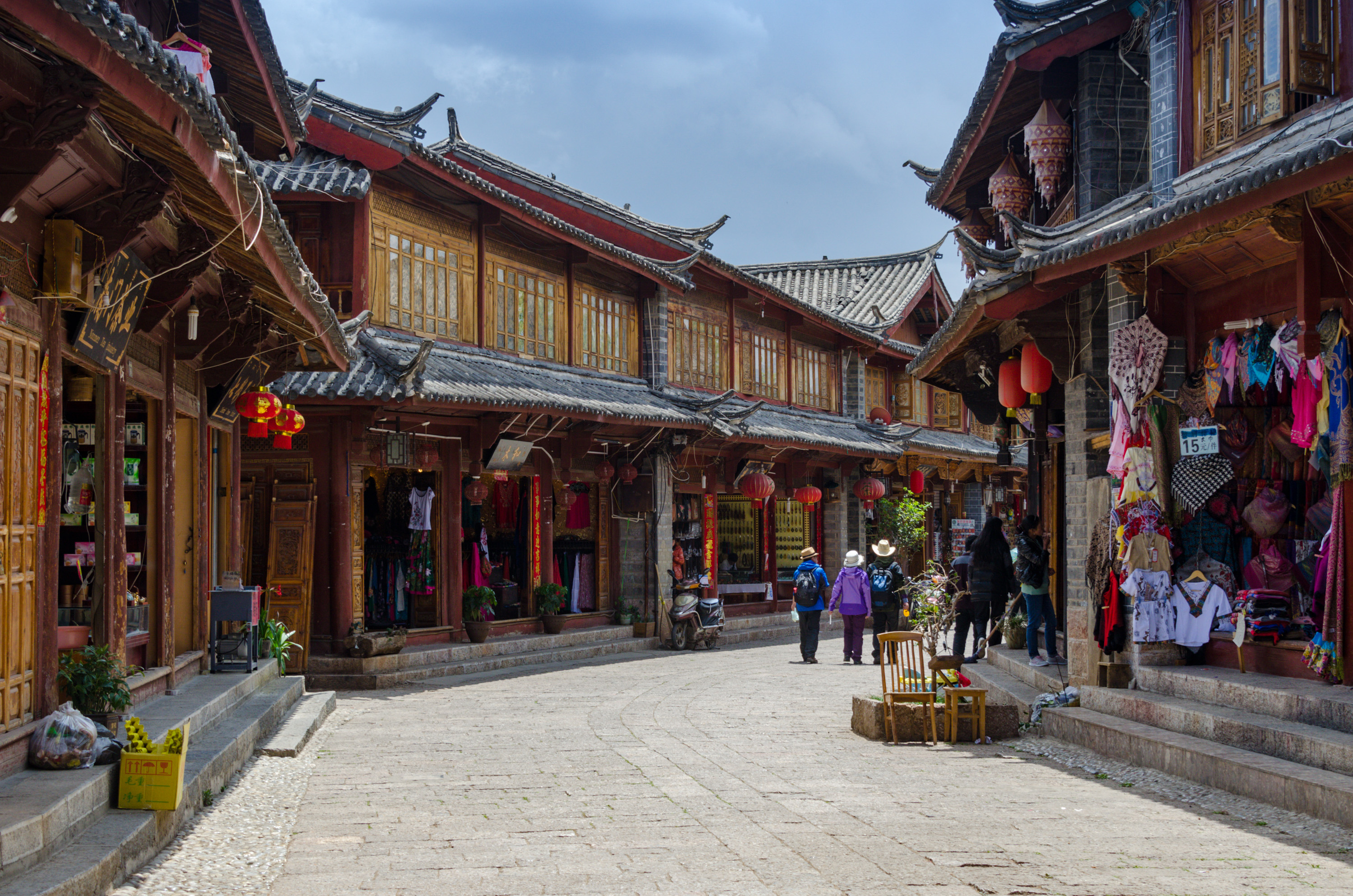
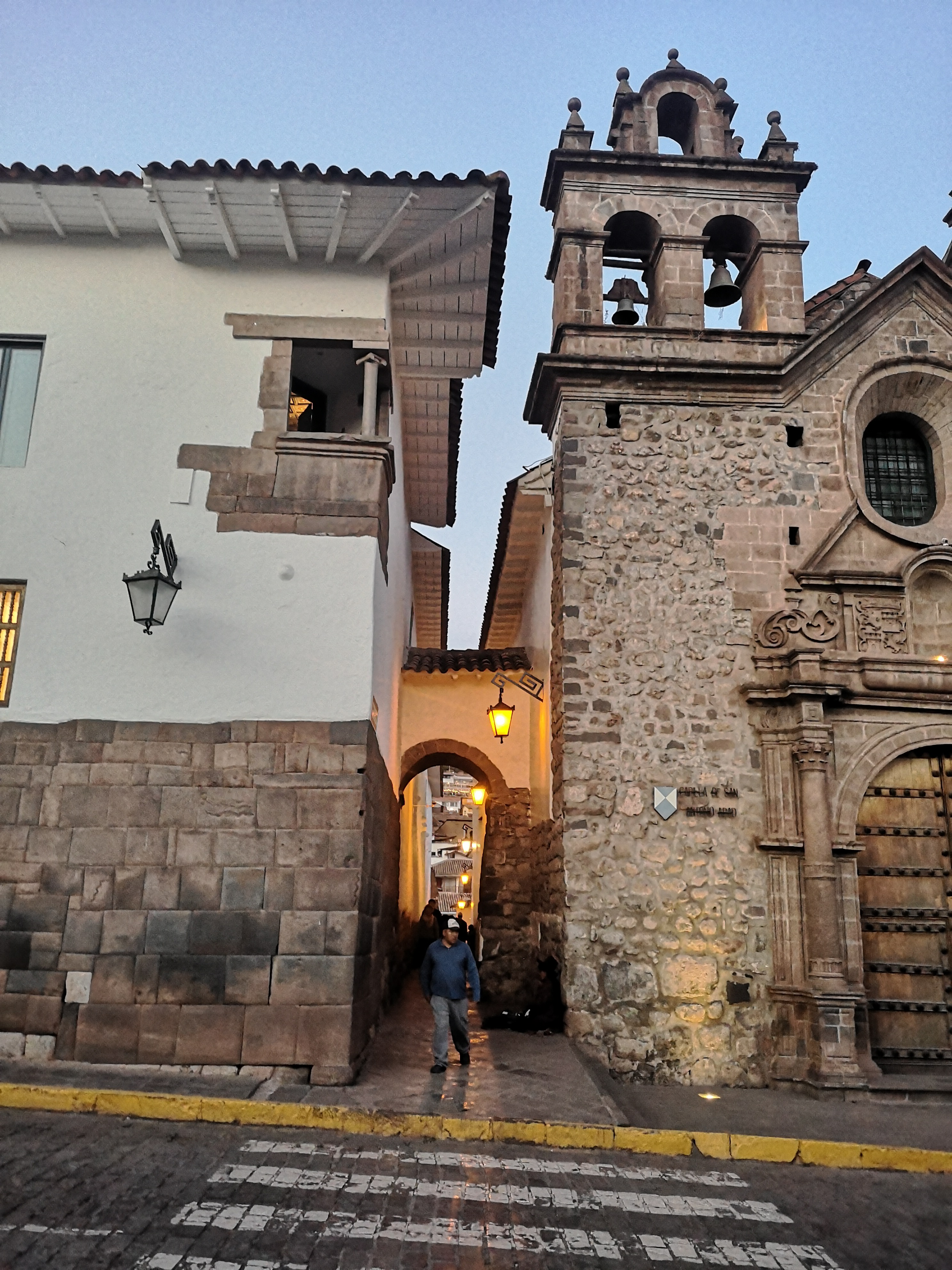
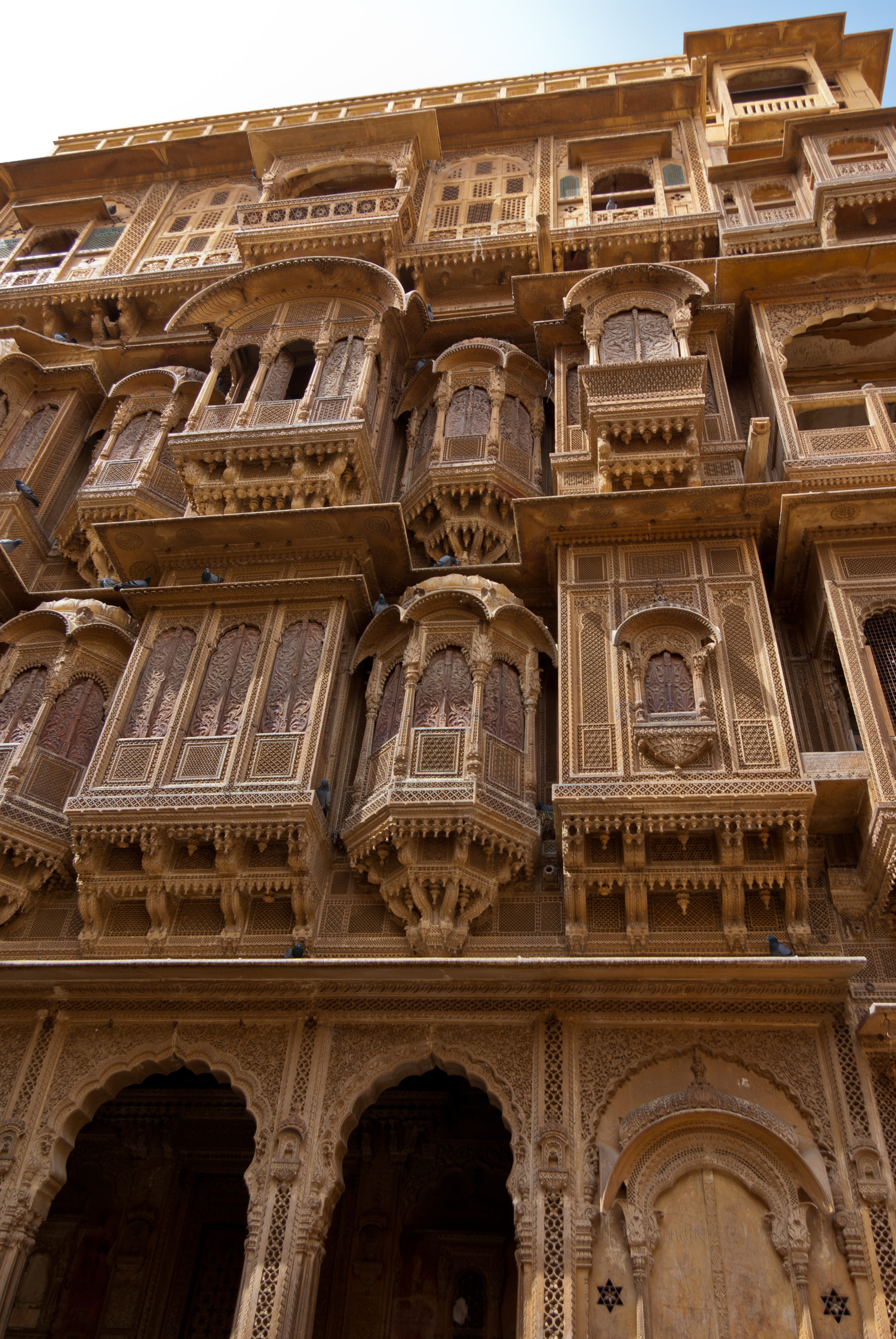
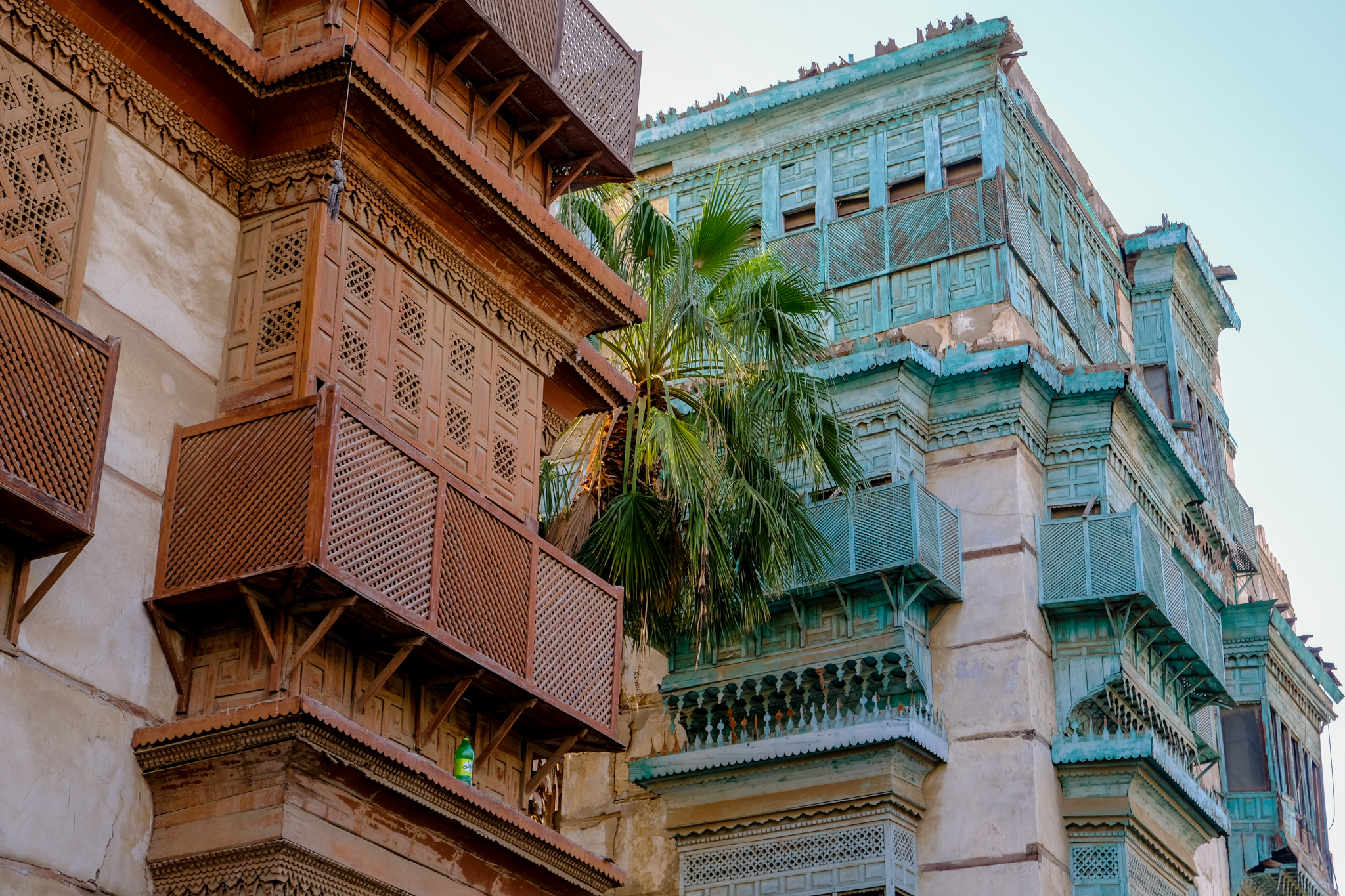
- Top: Old Town of Lijiang, China, China; Center left: Street in Cusco, Peru; Center right: Patwa Haveli in Jaisalmer, India; Bottom: Al-Balad, Jeddah, Saudi Arabia
- Years active: 9000 BC–present
- Location: International

Traditional architecture is the built expression of a cultural heritage transmitted across generations, but it is not a singular architectural style, since it is neither defined stylistically nor by time period, but rather by its geographical or cultural context. The term traditional does not necessarily mean that building forms are static, as new techniques and approaches are continuously adopted and adapted by local craftspeople.

Distinct from vernacular architecture, it does not exclude architect-designed or monumental buildings, but instead encompasses a wide range of structures and building types, including the vernacular.

Broadly speaking, all architectural styles can be split into two groups: traditional and modernist (which includes modernism's ideological successors); this is because modernist architecture was created in opposition to tradition.

== Revival ==
=== Philosophy ===
According to Jiri Lev a contemporary revival of traditional architecture could be seen as a pragmatic response to modern environmental, health, and housing crises. He maintains that architecture should be "of its place," rooted in the concept of genius loci (the spirit of a place), respecting historical context to foster community cohesion. He says the natural economy of traditional architecture "obtains best outcomes with minimum possible outlay of energy and resources. Like in nature, this fine-tuned balance usually also results in aesthetically pleasing results." Leon Krier argues that as a body of technical knowledge, traditional architecture and urbanism is a method of habitation in a way that is ethical, beautiful, and ecological. Eventually, their forms and materials, as well as their quantity, position, size and scale, will be defined by geography, climate and ecology.

In context of sustainability, Steve Mouzon talks of historical and new buildings designed using the lessons of the past as the "living tradition" - a collective intelligence underpinning naturally sustainable buildings and places. Incorporating regional materials, techniques, craftsmanship and skills into the built environment leads to lasting cultural narratives, maintaining architectural diversity and richness.

=== Traditional versus modernist architecture ===
Branko Mitrovic argues that contemporary architecture has largely abandoned visual and formal competence in favor of verbal narratives and "conceptual storytelling." In his works, such as Architectural Principles in the Age of Fraud, Mitrovic critiques the "Obfuscatory Turn" in modernism, where complex philosophical jargon—often borrowed from phenomenology or deconstruction—is used to mask aesthetic failures and a lack of formal design education. He advocates for a return to classical and traditional principles, particularly the study of Renaissance masters like Andrea Palladio, maintaining that beauty is not a subjective whim but a cognitive necessity. Mitrovic contends that formal lessons in symmetry, proportion, and spatial composition remain universally relevant, providing a necessary counterpoint to what he describes as the visual inferiority and "greenwashing" of much contemporary design.

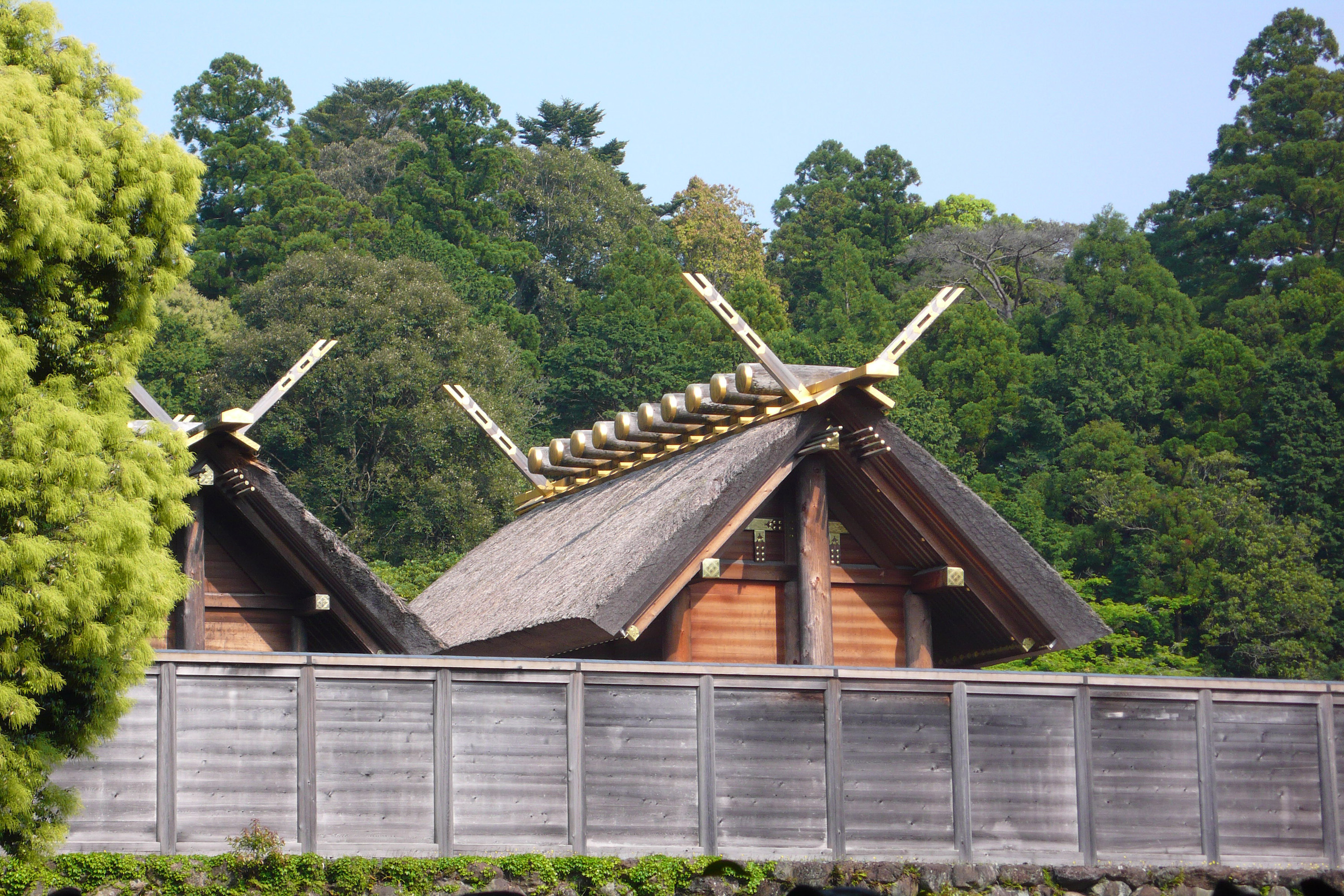
Ise Shrine in Japan

Japanese buddhist temples have been continuously rebuilt, expanded and updated with contemporary technologies while maintaining their traditional architectural character for many centuries.

=== Movement and initiatives ===
Schools teaching contemporary traditional architecture include Notre Dame School of Architecture, Utah Valley University School of Architecture and American College of the Building Arts, with growing interest and institutions worldwide.

Various groups, organisations and awards exist that promote traditional principles in architecture and urbanism, such as Traditional Architecture Group (UK), Institute of Classical Architecture & Art (US), The Urban Guild (US), Architectural Uprising (Sweden) or INTBAU (international).

In the United States structural masonry is experiencing revival in contemporary traditional architecture.

In India buildings with courtyards and balconies are made from handmade clay tiles and stone masonry for resilience and natural cooling.

In Australia simple, traditional homes are built using local materials and low-tech construction methods, addressing high labour costs and housing affordability crisis.

Examples of government policy formed on contemporary traditional architectural principles include Saudi Arabia's design guidelines on its distinctive architectural styles, or European city councils increasingly attentive to traditional architectural principles, as in Norway's Bergen, Oppdal and Grünerløkka, or broader movements such as European Urban Renaissance.
