= Institute of Classical Architecture and Art =

American nonprofit organization

The Institute of Classical Architecture & Art (ICAA) is an American nonprofit organization dedicated to advancing the appreciation and practice of traditional architecture and its allied arts by engaging with educators, professionals, students, and enthusiasts. It does so through education, publication, awards, and advocacy. The institute was formed in 2002 with the merger of two nonprofit organizations: The Institute of Classical Architecture (founded in 1991), and Classical America (founded in 1968).

In addition to its New York City headquarters in the building of the General Society of Mechanics and Tradesmen of the City of New York, the institute maintains fifteen regional chapters, intended to extend the reach of its public service. Each chapter organizes its own programming to reflect the interests of its members, and the architectural traditions of its region.

ICAA's membership represents a diverse cross-section of the building arts, including architects, interior designers, patrons, builders, and artisans. According to the institute's website, its members benefit from the institute's local and national programs and from the networking opportunities that membership offers, and the institute improves its programs by responding to the needs and interests of its membership.

== Education ==
The institute offers educational resources for students of art, planning, and architecture; for design professionals; and for the general public. These include: intensive seminars for architecture and design students, continuing education courses, travel programs, and public lectures.

== Publication ==
ICAA publishes The Classicist, an academic journal, as well as the book series the Classical America Series in Art and Architecture.

== Awards, prizes, and scholarships ==
The Arthur Ross Awards, founded by Arthur Ross and administered annually by ICAA, recognize the achievements of architects, painters, sculptors, artisans, landscape designers, educators, publishers, patrons, and others dedicated to preserving and advancing the classical tradition. The philanthropist Brooke Astor presented the initial awards in 1982. ICAA offers two affiliated fellowships at the American Academy in Rome which it says are intended “to advance the career of the architect or artist recipient and to foster a continuity of knowledge of the classical tradition as a vital aspect of contemporary culture around the globe.”

ICAA offers two bi-annual prizes: The Rieger Graham Prize for architecture and the Alma Schapiro Prize for fine arts. The institute awards each prize in alternate years and offers recipients a three-month Fellowship at the American Academy in Rome.

Awards and prizes of ICAA's regional chapters include:

- Acanthus Awards (since 2013, awarded by the Chicago-Midwest regional chapter)
- Addison Mizner Medal (since 2012, awarded by the Florida regional chapter)
- A. Hays Town Award (beginning in 2023, awarded by the Louisiana regional chapter)
- Bulfinch Awards (since 2010, awarded by the New England regional chapter)
- John Staub Awards (since 2011, awarded by the Texas regional chapter)
- Julia Morgan Awards (since 2014, awarded by the Northern California regional chapter)
- McKim, Mead & White awards (since 2012, awarded by the New York regional chapter)
- Newman Awards (since 2013, awarded by the Rocky Mountain regional chapter)
- Shutze Awards (since 2007, awarded by the Southeast regional chapter)
- Trumbauer Awards (since 2016, awarded by the Philadelphia regional chapter)

== Advocacy and public programs ==
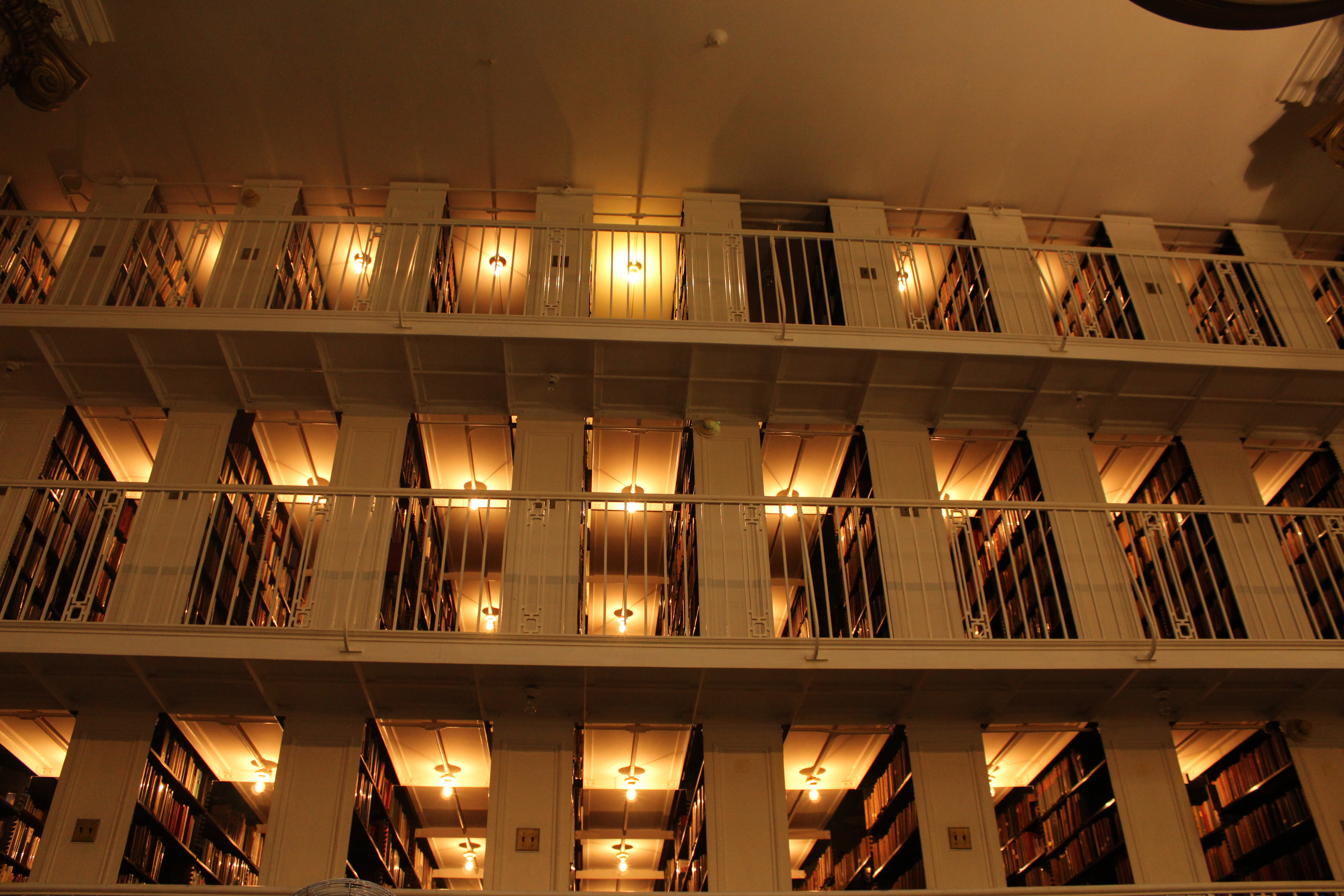
Bookcases at New York office

The ICAA serves its members and the general public through public lectures, walking tours, travel programs, and special events. Offered throughout the year, these activities include a Member Lecture Program (often free of charge to members and often in collaboration with like-minded organizations) and Discover Classical New York, which takes members on walking tours to visit classical or traditional sites in the five boroughs and beyond.

Other programs include the annual McKim Lecture, a collaboration with the One West 54th Street Foundation and the Summer Lecture Series.

== See also ==
- Classical order
- Classical architecture
- Traditional architecture
- New Classical architecture
