= Richard Driehaus =

American businessman (1942–2021)

Richard Herman Driehaus (/ˈdriːhaʊs/; July 28, 1942 – March 9, 2021) was an American businessman, investor, and philanthropist. He was the founder, chief investment officer, and chairman of the hedge fund Driehaus Capital Management LLC, based in Chicago.

The philanthropic activities of the Richard H. Driehaus Foundation and the Charitable Trust are widely acknowledged in the fields of culture, arts, heritage protection, journalism and architecture, including the renowned global Driehaus Architecture Prize for new classical architecture.

In 2000, he was named in Barron's "All-Century" team of the 25 individuals who have been the most influential within the mutual fund industry over the past 100 years. His firm had $13.2 billion in assets under management as of March 2021.

He is often credited as the father of momentum investing, as he popularized the investment strategy which called for spotting stocks on prolonged upward trends. This strategy reportedly delivered compound annual returns of 30% for Driehaus Capital Management in the 12 years after it was set up in the 1980s.

== Life ==
Driehaus was born in Chicago. He attended high school at St. Ignatius College Prep and received his undergraduate (1965) and master's (1970) degrees in business from DePaul University. He also received an honorary doctorate degree from DePaul in 2002.

From 1968 through 1973, Driehaus developed research ideas for the institutional trading department at A.G. Becker & Co. In 1973, he became director of research for Mullaney, Wells & Co. In 1976, he became director of research and a money manager for Jesup & Lamont. In 1979, he set up Driehaus Securities, a research broker that provided ideas to a select group of accounts, followed by Driehaus Securities LLC in 1980.

He founded Driehaus Capital Management LLC in 1982 and until his death was the current chief investment officer and chairman. He later founded Driehaus Mutual Funds in 1996, and Driehaus Capital Management (USVI) LLC in 1997.

Driehaus explained that "the momentum investor has confidence that a stock that is high can head even higher. We rarely invest in stock because it's cheap and hope for a turnaround."

Preoccupied with his career, Driehaus married in his early fifties. His two marriages ended in divorce. He and Kristyna (Pellouchoud), an architectural student, met in Prague and married in 1995. The couple had two daughters. In 2010 Richard Driehaus married Inese Romanovska, of Latvia.

Driehaus died at age 78 on March 9, 2021, at Northwestern Memorial Hospital in Chicago. He had suffered a cerebral hemorrhage the night before at his home. A private mass was held for him after his funeral. He was survived by his three daughters Tereza, Caroline, and Katherine (Kate) Driehaus.

== Awards ==
Driehaus was inducted as a laureate of The Lincoln Academy of Illinois and awarded the Order of Lincoln (the State’s highest honor) by the Governor of Illinois in 2017.

== Philanthropy ==
Driehaus has given widely both individually and through the Richard H. Driehaus Foundation and the Richard H. Driehaus Charitable Trust. He contributed an equivalent of $92 million in 2000's dollars from 1984 until 1987 already; and his foundations kept donating ever since.

Driehaus often pointed to his Roman Catholic roots as a guide to his philanthropic endeavors. Driehaus said, “You have to continue to learn your whole life, you have to be responsible for your own actions, and you have to give something back to society.”

He has said that his original plan was to give away only $100 million during his lifetime, but believed that he will end up parting with more than twice that amount.

=== Driehaus Architecture Prize ===
The Richard H. Driehaus Prize for Classical Architecture (short: Driehaus Architecture Prize) was established in 2003 and doubled to $200,000 in 2008. It is presented annually through the University of Notre Dame School of Architecture to honor a major contributor in the field of traditional and New Classical architecture.

In his 2012 interview with architect and urbanist Michael Lykoudis, Driehaus gives his inspiration for establishing the prize: "I believe architecture should be of human scale, representational form, and individual expression that reflects a community's architectural heritage. There is a delight, proportion, and harmony in classical architecture that I wasn’t finding in the contemporary buildings coming up around me in Chicago." The Driehaus Prize is often compared to the Pritzker Architecture Prize, which typically encourages modern design.

“The prize [...] represents a partial counterbalance to the rejection of classical forms by elite architecture that prevailed for much of the last century,” notes James Panero, an American culture critic. The Driehaus Prize is typically awarded around the same time, has similar terms, are both commemorated by a bronze award (the Pritzker is a medal and the Driehaus is a miniature Choragic Monument of Lysicrates), and, until 2008, both were the same monetary prize amount.

The first recipient of the Driehaus Prize was Léon Krier, who helped lay the theoretical framework for New Urbanism and designed the Prince of Wales' model town of Poundbury in England. The first American to win the prize was Allan Greenberg in 2006, who redesigned the interior of more than 30 rooms of the U.S. Department of State. The award has been given to architects associated with postmodernism, such as Michael Graves (2012) and David M. Schwarz (2015).

=== Classical architecture ===
Driehaus received the 2015 American Institute of Architects Lifetime Achievement Award for his contributions to architecture in Chicago and worldwide. The AIA noted his sponsorship of several design competitions which produced the IIT Campus Center, The Millennium Park Lurie Garden, and the Daniel Burnham Memorial, as well as the Richard H. Driehaus Prize for Classical Architecture.

In 2012, Driehaus publicly opposed Frank Gehry's modernist design proposal for the Dwight D. Eisenhower Memorial and funded a lobby group to block it. Driehaus said of the proposed memorial, "Architecturally, it didn’t speak to me. We want something more representational," but he also criticized the closed selection process.

Besides the Driehaus Museum, Driehaus' historic preservation projects include the Ransom Cable House (which hold the offices of his firm, Driehaus Capital Management) and the award-winning restoration of a 1905 Georgian Revival style house in Lake Geneva, Wisconsin. He was also involved in the National Trust for Historic Preservation, Landmarks Illinois, and the Wisconsin Trust for Historic Preservation.

=== Museum ===
The Driehaus Museum displays decorative arts of the Gilded Age and Art Nouveau eras in permanent and special exhibitions. It is housed in a historic Chicago landmark, the 1887 Samuel M. Nickerson Mansion. He described the museum as his "gift to the city." The museum is furnished with period furniture and decorative objects from Driehaus' collection to help visitors imagine how the Nickersons would have entertained and lived.

After a glorious restoration, the house was opened to the public as the Richard H. Driehaus Museum, devoted to the decorative arts of the Gilded Age.

Driehaus restored the sooty black exterior of the mansion to its original buff-colored sandstone facade with a two-inch laser over 18 months—the first building in the United States to be restored with such technology, although the practice has been fairly common in Europe over the past 30 years. In doing so, chemicals were avoided and the intricate details could be cleaned evenly. The Nickerson Mansion received the Chicago Landmark Awards for Preservation Excellence in 2008 upon completion of the restoration.

In 2018, the Driehaus Museum launched a contemporary art program. The inaugural exhibition featured the work of Yinka Shonibare.

In 2022, the Driehaus Museum acquired the adjacent John B. Murphy Memorial Auditorium, also a Chicago landmark building, and on June 21, 2024 opened the expanded Driehaus Museum campus.

=== DePaul University ===
In 2002, Driehaus donated $3.45 million to endow a chair and establish a center in behavioral finance. Driehaus donated $30 million to DePaul University in 2012—the largest gift DePaul has ever received. This contribution is used to recruit and retain faculty at the College of Commerce, which was renamed the Richard H. Driehaus College of Business.

=== Community outreach ===
Driehaus was an early supporter of Lisa Nigro's Inspiration Cafe in the Uptown neighborhood of Chicago, a nonprofit that helps 3,000 people each year by providing food, housing, and other services. He was touched by her story, which he heard through NPR.

He has also given to smaller dance and theater groups in Chicago, such as the Chicago Shakespeare Theatre, Hubbard Street Dance Company, Pegasus Players, Poetry Society of America, Trinity Irish Dance Company, and Redmoon Puppet Theater. He also was a major supporter of Catholic Extension, which builds churches in under-served communities. He has also donated $3 million to the Catholic prep school he attended, St. Ignatius, and gave over $1 million to preserve churches, synagogues and mosques.

=== Fashion ===
The annual Driehaus Awards Fashion Excellence gives students from the four Chicago-area design schools a chance to showcase their works, with monetary prizes for placed winners. He also underwrote the Red Hot Chicago Fashion Gala for young professional designers.

== See also ==
- Richard H. Driehaus Museum
- Momentum investing
- New Classical architecture
- Richard H. Driehaus Prize for Classical Architecture
