= Henry Hope Reed Jr. =

American architecture critic and urbanist

Henry Hope Reed Jr. (September 25, 1915 – May 1, 2013) was an American architecture critic known for his advocacy of classical architecture and his outspoken criticism of modernist architecture.

== Life ==
Born in Manhattan, Reed earned a degree in history from Harvard College in 1938. He also studied decorative arts at the École du Louvre in Paris. In 1952, he published his first work critical of modernism, a point of view he held until his death.

Reed lectured in the Department of Urban Planning at the University of Yale, made research on architecture and urbanism, gave walking tours of Manhattan’s historic architecture and neighborhoods, and published the book The Golden City in 1959.

Following several books advocating preservation of classical architecture in New York City, Reed was named curator of Central Park in 1966, thus becoming the first curator of the New York City Department of Parks and Recreation.

Reed co-founded Classical America, an organization committed to a resurgence of classical design, urbanism and architecture. It merged with The Institute of Classical Architecture in 2002.

The Henry Hope Reed Award was established in 2005, named in honor of Reed's legacy. It is awarded by the Notre Dame School of Architecture and sponsored by the Richard Driehaus Foundation. The prize is given to an individual working outside the practice of architecture who has supported the cultivation of the traditional city, its architecture and art through writing, planning or promotion. It is awarded in conjunction with the Driehaus Architecture Prize.

Reed died on May 1, 2013, at his home in Manhattan. He was 97. Reed's wife, the former Constance Culbertson Feeley, died in 2007. He left no immediate survivors.

== Works ==
Reed authored multiple books, including:

- The Golden City, 1959
- American Skyline, with Christopher Tunnard
- Central Park: A History and a Guide, with Sophia Duckworth
- The Library of Congress, with John Y. Cole
- The New York Public Library, with Francis Morrone
- Classical America Series in Art and Architecture, co-editor
- The United States Capitol: Its Architecture and Decoration
- The U.S. Capitol: Its Lesson for Today
