= Walsh Family Hall of Architecture =

Academic building in Indiana, United States

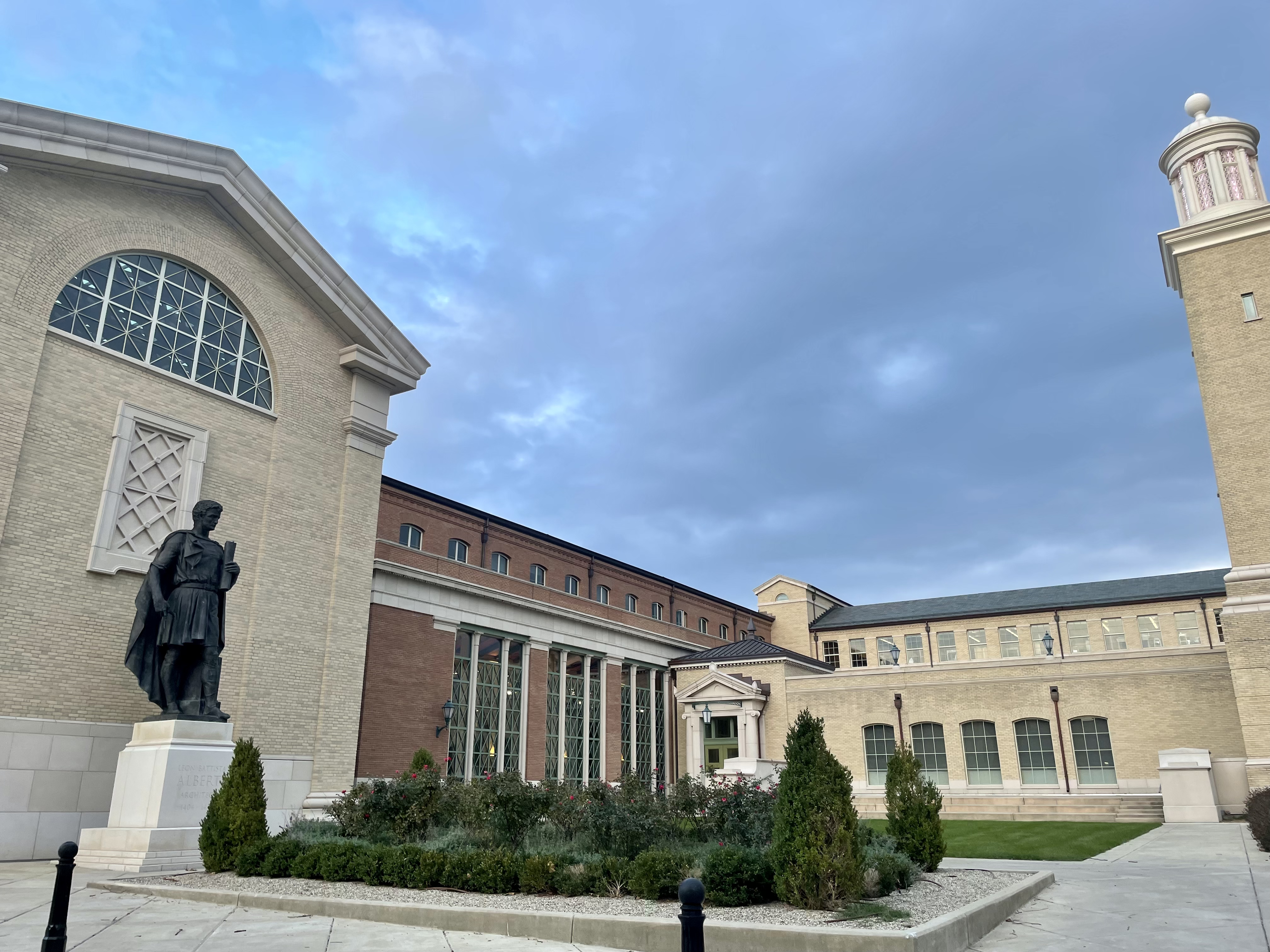
- The courtyard with the stoa, tower, and statue of Alberti
- Interactive map of the Walsh Family Hall of Architecture area

General information
- Type: Academic
- Architectural style: New Classical Architecture
- Location: Notre Dame, Indiana, United States
- Coordinates: 41°41′42″N 86°14′6″W
- Current tenants: Notre Dame School of Architecture
- Construction started: 2016
- Completed: 2019
- Owner: University of Notre Dame

Dimensions
- Other dimensions: 100,000 square feet

Design and construction
- Architect: John Simpson

The Walsh Family Hall of Architecture is a building on the campus of the University of Notre Dame and houses of the Notre Dame School of Architecture. Construction started in 2016 and was completed in 2019. The school was previously hosted in Bond Hall. Designed by John Simpson, it is an example of New Classical architecture, for which the School of Architecture is well known for. The complex features a Greek-architecture inspired Hall of Casts, a stoa, a tower and a courtyard. The building design won several awards for its design.

== History ==
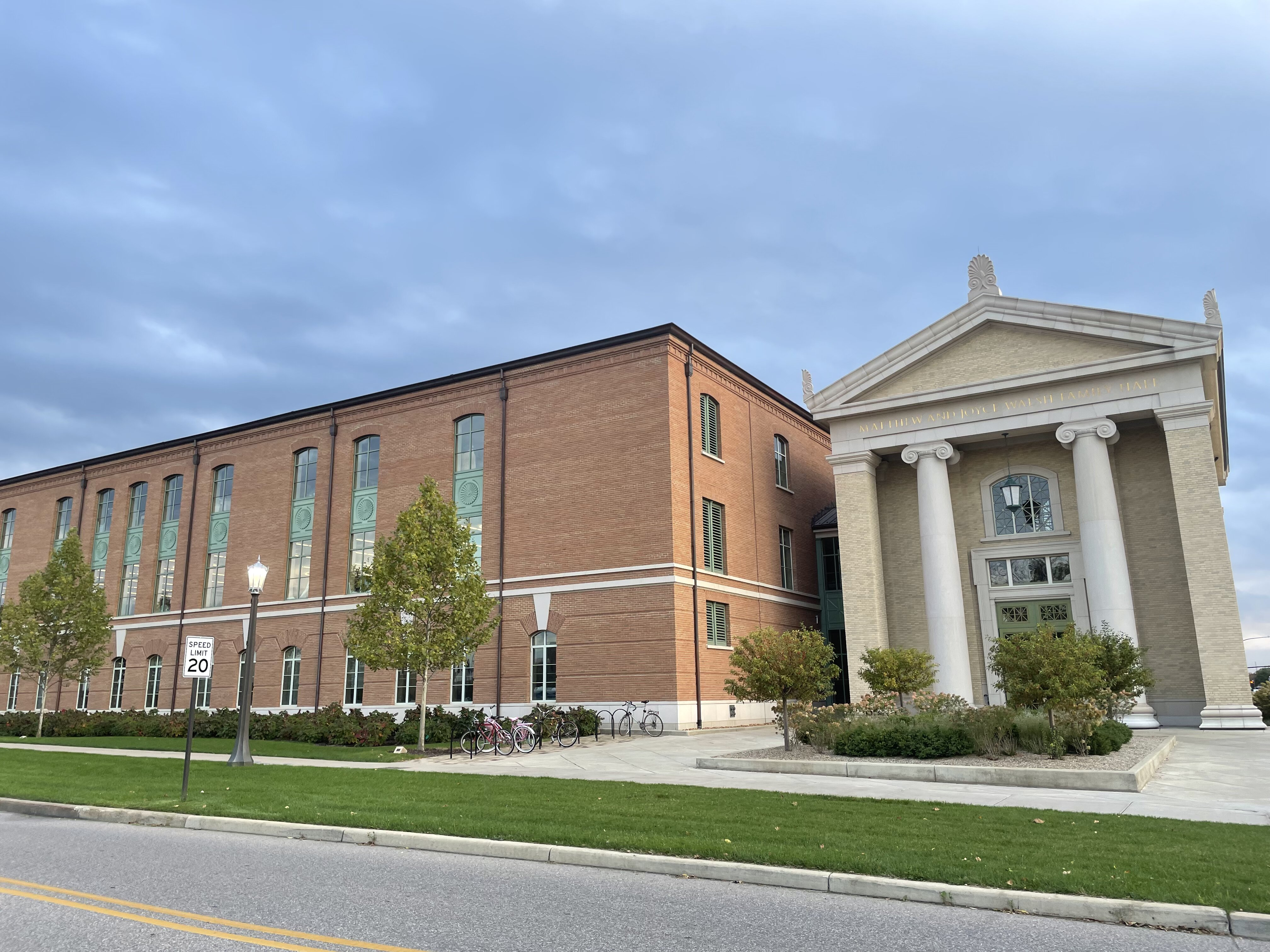
The front of the building, with the Hall of Casts

The school of architecture was previously hosted in Bond Hall. In 2013, a 27 million dollar donation from the Walsh family was announced for the construction of a bigger and newer hall. Architect John Simpson was announced as the winner of a competition to design the building in 2014. Construction started on 31 October 2016 and was completed in January 2019. The 110,000-square-foot building was designed by John Simpson and the Stantec group, with the structural engineering done by Thornton Tomasetti and built by the Walsh Group. It was named after a $33 million donation by Matthew Walsh, a 1968 Notre Dame graduate and co-chairman of the Walsh Construction Group. It was built in the southern side of campus, in the new fine arts district, close to the O'Neill Hall, the DeBartolo Performing Arts Center, Charles B. Hayes Family Sculpture Park and the planned Raclin Murphy Museum of Art, and a future fine arts building. It was dedicated on November 9, 2018. The additional space helped house the growing school, including providing space for two new graduate programs: historic preservation and real estate development. The building was built with several energy-saving features and is on track to receive LEED Gold certification, and features natural light operable windows.

It received the 2019 Acanthus Award of The Institute of Classical Architecture and Art for Institutional or Commercial Architecture and the 2019 Distinguished Building Award from the American Institute of Architects Chicago. A statue of Leon Battista Alberti was added in August 2019.

== Architecture ==
The architecture style of the building is New Classicism and New Urbanism, of which the Notre Dame School of Architecture itself is well known for and is one of the preeminent academic centers for, and for which it awards the Driehaus Architecture Prize. The architect of the building is John Simpson, who is a major figure of New Classicism and has won himself the Driehaus Prize, and is inspired by the classical elements taught in the École des Beaux-Arts. According to these principles, the building is spartan and durable in its construction materials to maximize functionality, durability, and economy, while having more elaborate and decorated styles in the main entrance, hall of casts, auditoriums and the library. Commissioning the building in this style was intended to provide a suitable space in line with the school's goals and a source of inspiration for students.

The architectural composition of the building consists of multiple structures organized around a central court, resembling a traditional college quadrangle. This arrangement includes north-facing studios housed in a two-story wing along the northern side, a library situated to the east, and an auditorium and exhibition galleries positioned along the primary circulation spine. The courtyard entrance is distinguished by an Ionic portico, and strategically located at the center is a tower designed to terminate views from the university's main entrance. Additionally, this central tower serves the practical function of facilitating access to the external amphitheater. Within the building, the architectural studios are accommodated in a two-story wing along the northern perimeter, while the library occupies the eastern side. Simultaneously, the auditorium and exhibition galleries are strategically placed along the main circulation spine, which takes the form of a Greek stoa. The entrance to the building is accentuated by an Ionic portico, and the central tower within the court is intentionally positioned to command attention from the university's main entrance and to streamline access to the external amphitheater.

One of the main features of the building is the Hall of Casts, a monumental Greek-temple-like structure which acts as main entrance and houses the school's cast collection. It is the most monumental building of the, and its ornamentation is in contrast with the more utilitarian feel of the adjacent studio hall. The stoa serves as the central hub within the edifice, facilitating both routine informal collaboration and hosting special events. This grand hall is fashioned after the architectural principles of ancient Greek markets. Functioning as a classical portico or roofed colonnade, it interconnects key components such as design studios, the auditorium, library, exhibition hall, and faculty office suites. The courtyard features a tower is a distinguishing feature reflecting the character of the building. The lantern is a reference to the Choragic Monument of Lysicrates in Athens and is a gesture to the classical origins.The tower is used to articulate the central court, creating a more public space alongside the stoa, open to Irish Green garden, with an amphitheater-like structure, which is used for events such as commencement ceremonies. A more private raised square under the tower serves as the stoa's outdoor counterpart in providing a gathering space for interaction and exchange of ideas.

The courtyard of the building features a 14 ft sculpture of Leon Battista Alberti, architect and key feature of the Italian Renaissance, by Scottish sculptor Alexander Stoddart, the artist's tallest single figure. Alberti's ideas of balance and harmony between the individual and the city are inspiration for the new urbanism philosophy taught at the school.

== Bibliography ==
- Aslet, Clive (2021). The Academy : celebrating the work of John Simpson at the Walsh Family Hall, University of Notre Dame, Indiana. Matthew Walsh, Joyce Walsh, Michael Lykoudis, Ian Griffey, Angelica Ketcham, Hallie Swenson. London. ISBN 1-9163554-2-0. OCLC 1187224652.
