= Driehaus Architecture Prize =

- Current: John Simpson (architect)
- Awarded for: A career of achievement in the art of traditional and classical architecture.
- Sponsored by: The Richard H. Driehaus Charitable Lead Trust
- Presented by: The University of Notre Dame School of Architecture
- Rewards: US$200,000 (Reed Award: US$50,000)
- First award: 2003; 23 years ago
- Website: driehausprize.nd.edu

The Driehaus Architecture Prize, fully named The Richard H. Driehaus Prize at the University of Notre Dame, is a global award to honor a major contributor in the field of contemporary traditional and classical architecture. The Driehaus Prize was conceived as an alternative to the predominantly modernist Pritzker Prize.

It was co-founded by fund manager and philanthropist Richard Driehaus and Dean of the University of Notre Dame School of Architecture Michael Lykoudis and was established in 2003 by the Richard H. Driehaus Charitable Lead Trust. It is presented annually through the School of Architecture at the University of Notre Dame in Indiana, United States, which teaches a classical approach to architecture.

The jury also awards the Henry Hope Reed Award (given in conjunction with the Driehaus Prize) to an individual working outside the practice of architecture, who has supported the cultivation of the traditional city, its architecture and art through writing, planning or promotion. The 2020 Reed Award was given to Clem Labine, the creator of the Palladio Award, which recognizes excellence in traditional design, and the eponymous Clem Labine Award for creating more humane and beautiful environments.

== Award ==
The Driehaus Prize is awarded to a living architect whose work embodies the principles of traditional and classical architecture and urbanism in contemporary society, and reflects what the jury considers positive cultural, environmental and artistic impacts. The award itself is a bronze miniature of the Choragic Monument of Lysicrates, known as the first use of the Corinthian order on the outside of a building. The award includes a monetary prize of US$200,000.

The award jury annually selects an architect who has greatly influenced the field of traditional and classical architecture. The jury travels together to a city of architectural significance, exploring it together, and taking the city's urban fabric as a backdrop for its deliberations.

The jury has included notable architects and educators such as Adele Chatfield-Taylor (since 2004, President Emerita of the American Academy in Rome), Robert S. Davis (since 2009, developer and co-founder of Seaside, Florida), Paul Goldberger (since 2006, former architecture critic for The New Yorker), Léon Krier (since 2005, inaugural Driehaus Prize recipient), Witold Rybczynski (since 2011, architecture critic and professor of urbanism at the University of Pennsylvania), Demetri Porphyrios (since 2013, is a Greek architect and author who practices architecture in London as principal of the firm Porphyrios Associates), and Elizabeth Plater-Zyberk (since 2017, founder of DPZ).

In 2012, the then Charles, Prince of Wales (current King Charles III) accepted The Richard H. Driehaus Prize at the University of Notre Dame Patronage Award during a ceremony Jan. 27 at St James's Palace in London.

== History ==
A precursor to the Driehaus Architecture Prize is the Philippe Rotthier European Prize for Architecture that is awarded since 1982.

Driehaus, the founder, chief investment officer and chairman of Driehaus Capital Management in Chicago, established the award program through Notre Dame in 2003 because of its reputation as a national leader in incorporating the ideals of traditional and classical architecture into the task of modern urban development. In 2007, Driehaus announced that he would increase the prize monies given out annually through the Driehaus Prize and the Reed Award to a combined $250,000. The two prizes represent the most significant recognition for classicism in the contemporary built environment.

Driehaus, the founder, chief investment officer and chairman of Driehaus Capital Management in Chicago, co-founded the award program in 2003 with Michael Lykoudis, who at the time was the Dean of the University of Notre Dame School of Architecture. Driehaus collaborated with Dean Lykoudis, who organized and chaired the jury, to recognize those practitioners and scholars who made seminal contributions to modern traditional architecture and urbanism. Dreihaus chose to work with the University of Notre Dame because of its reputation as a national leader in incorporating the ideals of traditional and classical architecture into the task of modern urban development. In 2007, Driehaus announced that he would increase the prize monies given out annually through the Driehaus Prize and the Reed Award to a combined $250,000. The two prizes represent the most significant recognition for classicism in the contemporary built environment.

The oil painting A Classical Perspective, made by Carl Laubin in 2012, is a capriccio of an imaginary city that consists of buildings designed by Driehaus Prize recipients.

== Laureates ==
The following architects have been awarded the Driehaus Prize since 2003:

Year	Laureate	Nationality	Photo	Example work (years built)		Website	Ref.
2003	Léon Krier	Luxembourg	The inaugural laureate Léon Krier in Frankfurt, 2007		Masterplan of Poundbury, England (1993)	Unofficial fan site	
2004	Demetri Porphyrios	Greece		Whitman College	Whitman College, Princeton University, Princeton, USA (2002)	Porphyrios Associates	
2005	Quinlan Terry	United Kingdom		Maitland Robinson Library, Cambridge, UK	Maitland Robinson Library, Cambridge, United Kingdom, (1993)	Quinlan and Francis Terry Architects	
2006	Allan Greenberg	South Africa		Aaron Burr Hall	Aaron Burr Hall, Princeton University, Princeton, USA (2003–2005)	Allan Greenberg LLC	
2007	Jaquelin T. Robertson	United States		Celebration Town Square	Masterplan of Celebration, Florida, USA (2000)	Cooper, Robertson & Partners	
2008	Andrés Duany and Elizabeth Plater-Zyberk	United States	Andrés Duany in Biloxi, 2005	Seaside, Florida	Masterplan of Seaside, Florida, USA (1985)	Duany Plater-Zyberk & Company	
2009	Abdel-Wahed El-Wakil	Egypt		Qiblatain Mosque	New Qiblatain Mosque, Medina, Saudi Arabia (1987)	Awwakil	
2010	Rafael Manzano Martos	Spain		Prado Museum	Museo del Prado extension, Madrid, Spain (1990)	Estudio Manzano	
2011	Robert A. M. Stern	United States	Historic Districts Council Landmarks Lion awards in 2015	Four Seasons Hotel New York Downtown	Four Seasons Hotel New York Downtown, New York City, USA (2016)	Robert A. M. Stern Architects	
2012	Michael Graves	United States	Michael Graves, drawing 2003	Hard Rock Hotel Singapore	Resorts World Sentosa, Sentosa, Singapore (2010)	Michael Graves & Associates	
2013	Thomas H. Beeby	United States		Harold Washington Library in Chicago	Harold Washington Library, Chicago, Illinois, USA (1991)	HBRA Architects	
2014	Pier Carlo Bontempi	Italy	Pier Carlo Bontempi in 2014	Place de Toscane in Serris, France	Place de Toscane, Val d'Europe, France (2002)	Studio Pier Carlo Bontempi	
2015	David M. Schwarz	United States		Globe Life Park in Arlington, United States	Globe Life Park in Arlington, Texas, USA (1994)	David M. Schwarz Architects	
2016	Scott Merrill	United States		Seaside Chapel in Seaside Florida	Seaside Chapel in Florida, designed in 2001	Merrill, Pastor & Colgan Architects	
2017	Robert Adam	United Kingdom		Millennium Gate in Atlanta, USA	Millennium Gate in Atlanta, USA (2008)	ADAM Architecture	
2018	Marc Breitman & Nada Breitman-Jakov	France		Westermoskee, Netherlands	Westermoskee, Amsterdam, Netherlands (2015)	Breitman & Breitman Architectes	
2019	Maurice Culot	Belgium			Masterplan of Hardelot, France (2002)	ARCAS Architecture & Urbanism	
2020	Ong-ard Satrabhandhu	Thailand			The Rachamankha, Chiang Mai, Thailand (2004)	Ong-ard Architects	
2021	Sebastian Treese	Germany			Eisenzahnstraße 1, Berlin, Germany (2016)	Sebastian Treese Architects	
2022	Rob Krier	Luxembourg			Judiciary City, Luxembourg (2008)	Rob Krier	
2023	Ben Pentreath	United Kingdom			Masterplan of South East Faversham, England (2023)	Ben Pentreath Studio	
2024	Peter Pennoyer	United States			The Benson on Madison Avenue, New York City, USA (2023)	Peter Pennoyer Architects	
2025	Liam O'Connor	United Kingdom			Memorial Gates, London (2002)	Liam O'Connor Architects	
2026	John Simpson	United Kingdom			Walsh Family Hall of Architecture at University of Notre Dame (2019)	John Simpson Architects	

=== Laureates by country ===
Rank	Country	Continent	Laureates
1	United States	North America	8
2	United Kingdom	Europe	4
3	Luxembourg	Europe	2
4	Belgium	Europe	1
4	Egypt	Africa	1
4	France	Europe	1
4	Germany	Europe	1
4	Greece	Europe	1
4	Italy	Europe	1
4	South Africa	Africa	1
4	Spain	Europe	1
4	Thailand	Asia	1

== See also ==
- New Classical Architecture
- Vernacular architecture
- New Urbanism
- Richard H. Driehaus
- Henry Hope Reed Jr.
- Notre Dame School of Architecture
- Philippe Rotthier European Prize for Architecture
- Rafael Manzano Prize

== Bibliography ==
- "The Richard H. Driehaus Prize". Richard H. Driehaus Prize official site. The University of Notre Dame.
- Keegan, Edward. "Abdel-Wahed El-Wakil Wins 2009 Driehaus Prize". Architect Magazine. Hanley Wood.
- Richter, Jennifer. "Duany and Plater-Zyberk Donate Driehaus Winnings". Architectural Record. The McGraw-Hill Companies, Inc.
- Keegan, Edward. "Jaquelin Robertson Receives Driehaus Prize". Architect Magazine. Hanley Wood.
- "The designer of which of these buildings just won the USs richest architecture prize?". Building Design. UBM Built Environment.
- "Classical Porphyrios Prized". ArchitectureWeek. Artifice, Inc.
- Leach, Susan Llewelyn (10 April 2003). "The shape of things to come". The Christian Science Monitor.
- Van Gelder, Lawrence (March 4, 2003). "Arts Briefing". The New York Times.
- 2009: Driehaus Prize and Henry Hope Reed Award, vol. 22, Clem Labine's Traditional Building, February 2009, p. 144, ISSN 0898-0284
- 2008: Driehaus Prize and Henry Hope Reed Award, vol. 21, Clem Labine's Traditional Building, June 2008, p. 167, ISSN 0898-0284
- 2007 Henry Hope Reed Award, Clem Labine's Traditional Building, June 2007, p. 167, ISSN 0898-0284
- Driehaus Prize & Reed Award: honors for Greenberg & Morton, vol. 19, Clem Labine's Traditional Building, June 2006, p. 208, ISSN 0898-0284
- Porphyrios prized: Demetri Porphyrios, the acclaimed architect and author, is this year's recipient of the Driehaus Prize, vol. 17, Clem Labine's Traditional Building, May–June 2004, p. 198, ISSN 0898-0284
- Blackler, Zoe (17 April 2003), Krier lands anti-Pritzker for promotion of Classicism, vol. 217, Architects' Journal, p. 12, ISSN 0003-8466
- Connell, Kim A. (2007), Pragmatic idealist: Jaquelin Robertson, Clem Labine's Traditional Building, pp. 10–14, ISSN 0898-0284
- Yee, Roger (September 2003), "Classicism vs. modernism", Architect: The Magazine of the American Institute of Architects, 92 (9), Architecture: 31–32, ISSN 0746-0554
