= Arthur Ross Award =

Annual architecture and design awards

- Country: United States
- First award: 1982
- Website: www.classicist.org

The Arthur Ross Awards for Excellence in the Classical Tradition are annual awards established in 1982 by philanthropist Arthur Ross and Classical America. Administered by the Institute of Classical Architecture and Art (ICAA) in New York City, the awards recognize achievements by architects, landscape designers, artisans, interior designers, educators, publishers, and patrons who preserve and advance the classical tradition in architecture and its allied arts.

Often described by Architectural Digest as the "Oscars of the design world," the awards celebrate lifetime achievements and significant contributions to classical architecture, urbanism, and craftsmanship.

== History ==
The awards were founded in 1982 by Arthur Ross, a prominent American philanthropist, diplomat, and advocate for classical architecture and public art, alongside the organization Classical America (which later merged to form the ICAA). The inaugural awards were presented by philanthropist Brooke Astor.

Over the decades, the awards have honored notable figures and firms in classical design, including architects such as Robert A. M. Stern, Quinlan Terry, John Simpson, and Robert Adam, as well as historians, craftsmen, and institutions dedicated to maintaining classical standards in the built environment.

== Categories ==
Prizes are typically awarded across multiple categories reflecting the broad spectrum of traditional design disciplines:

- Architecture
- Landscape Architecture
- Interior Design
- Artisanship and Craftsmanship
- Stewardship and Adaptive Reuse
- Publishing and Education

== See also ==
- Institute of Classical Architecture and Art
- New Classical architecture
- Driehaus Architecture Prize
- Traditional architecture
