= Sculptor in Ordinary for Scotland =

Member of the Scottish royal household

The Sculptor in Ordinary for Scotland is a member of the royal household in Scotland. The first appointment was made by Queen Victoria around 1838, although it was not listed as a member of the royal household until the 1870s. The office was made permanent in 1921.

== Office holders ==
- c.1838–1891: Sir John Steell
- 1881–1890: Sir Joseph Edgar Boehm
- 1921–1938: Dr. James Pittendrigh Macgillivray
- 1938–1961: Sir William Reid Dick
- 1963–1984: Benno Schotz
- 1986–2005: Sir Eduardo Paolozzi
- 2008–present: Alexander Stoddart
