= South East Faversham =

Proposed new town in Kent, England

Coordinates: 51.302°N 0.905°E

South East Faversham is a planned new town outside of Faversham in Kent. The town master planner is architect Ben Pentreath.

== Location ==
The proposed development occupies 320 acres (130 ha) of farmland to the south east of Faversham, approximately bounded to the south and east by the M2 motorway, to the west by the A251 road, to the north by the former A2 road and bisected by the Dover branch of the Chatham Main Line. The land is identified for housing in the Borough of Swale draft Local Plan.

== Planning stage ==
The Duchy of Cornwall, which owns the land in question, aired the proposal in 2019. After Prince William succeeded his father as Duke of Cornwall, the Duchy confirmed it was continuing to pursue the plans for development.
