= Bond Hall (University of Notre Dame) =

Academic building at the University of Notre Dame

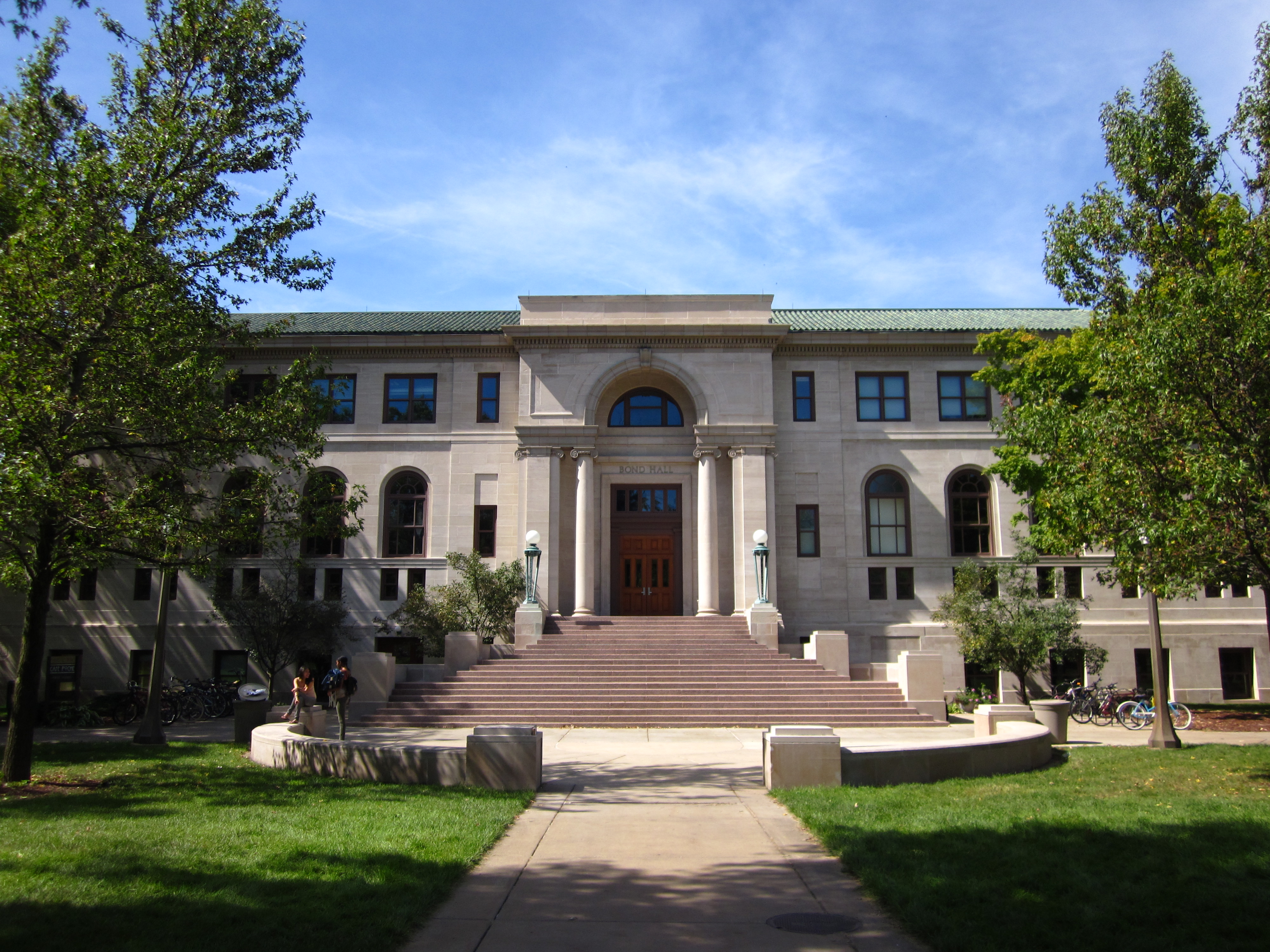
- Bond Hall, former home of the School of Architecture
- Former names: Lemonnier Library

General information
- Status: Used as the home of the school of architecture
- Type: Academic
- Architectural style: Neoclassical Architecture
- Location: Notre Dame, Indiana, United States
- Current tenants: University of Notre Dame
- Construction started: 1917
- Completed: 1917
- Renovated: 1964
- Owner: Congregation of Holy Cross

Dimensions
- Other dimensions: 70,021 square feet

Design and construction
- Architect: Edward Lippincott Tilton
- Bond Hall
- U.S. Historic district – Contributing property
- Location within Indiana
- Location: Notre Dame, Indiana
- Coordinates: 41°42′05″N 86°14′30″W
- Built: 1917
- Architect: Edward Tilton
- Architectural style: Neoclassical
- Part of: University of Notre Dame: Main and South Quadrangles (ID78000053)
- Added to NRHP: May 23, 1978

Bond Hall is a building on the campus of the University of Notre Dame which hosts student learning initiatives and a number of institutes including the Graduate School. It was originally built in 1917 as the Lemmonier Library and it housed the Notre Dame School of Architecture from 1964 to 2019. The architect was Edward Lippincott Tilton, a neoclassical architect who specialized in libraries. Its front steps are famous as the location of the Notre Dame Marching Band performances before the football games.

== History ==
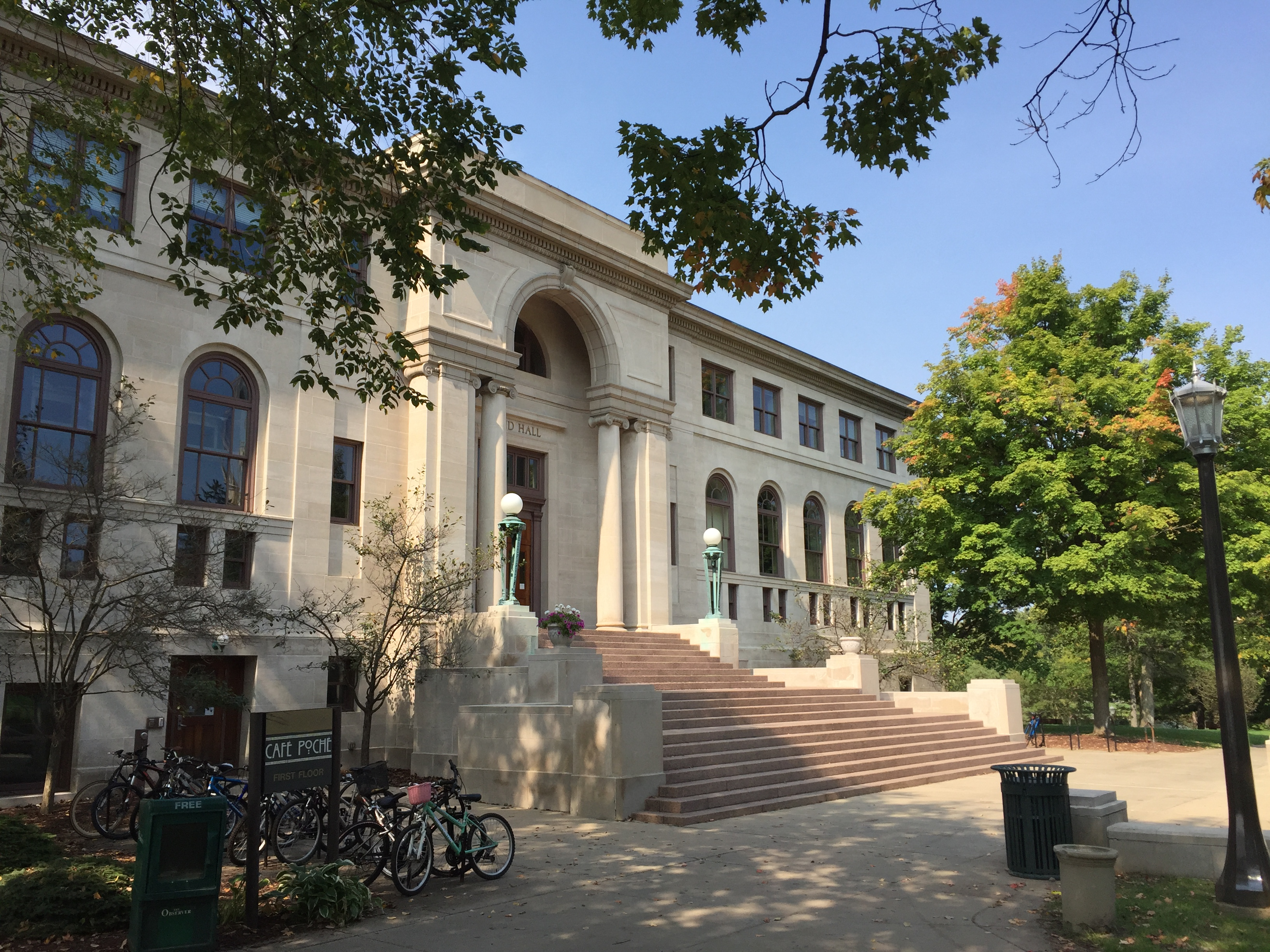
The main entrance to Bond Hall, built originally as Lemonnier Library

=== Lemonnier Library (1917–1964) ===
The current Bond Hall was built as Lemonnier Library in 1917 for $200,000 to replace the university's first library which was hosted on the third four in the east wing of the Main Building. The location of the new library, in the middle of the university farms, was also intended to make it less vulnerable to fire. Architect Edward Lippincott Tilton of New York designed the two-story, Beaux Arts Classical structure, which was made from Indiana limestone. Rev. Thomas J. Shahan blessed and dedicated the new library building and William Bourke Cockran delivered an oration on June 10, 1917, during the university's Diamond Jubilee celebrations. The building was named for Rev. Auguste Lemonnier, C.S.C. (1839–1874), the fourth president of Notre Dame from 1872 to 1874. Fr. Lemonnier was the creator of Notre Dame's first central circulating library in 1873. The great fire of 1879 destroyed all but 500 of the library's 10,000 books. Following that disaster, the library's collection grew to about 100,000 volumes when the move to the new Lemonnier Library was completed in 1917.

=== Architecture Building (1964–1995) ===
The building served as a library until September 18, 1963, when the Memorial Library (now Hesburgh Library) was finished and all of the books were transferred into it.

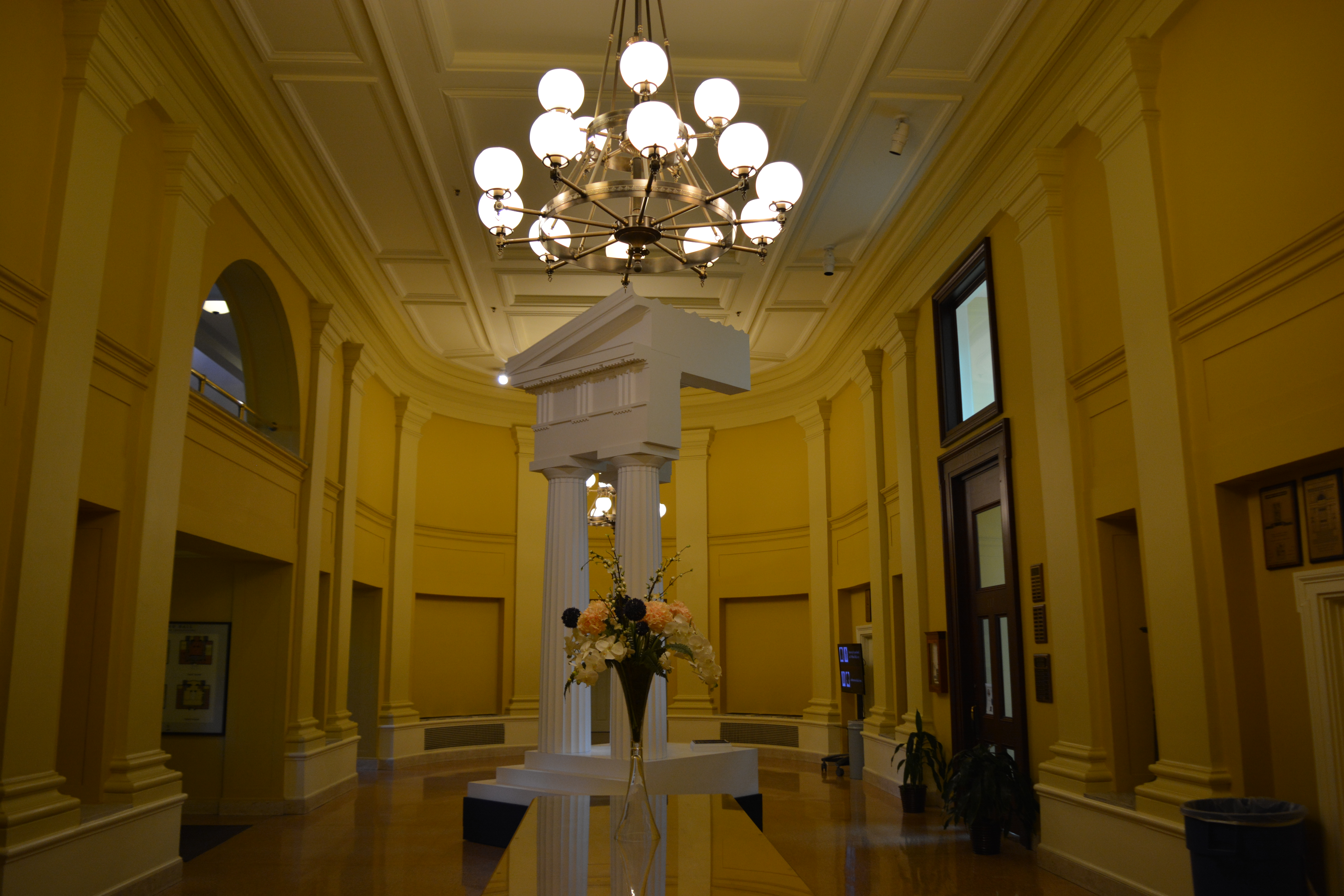
Main entrance to Bond Hall, with a scale model of the Parthenon's columns

The vacant Lemmonier Library was given to the Department of Architecture. The head of the department at the time, Frank Montana, designed plans to renovate the interiors to fit the new needs of the Architecture school. The original limestone exterior with Ionic detailing on the east side was preserved and restored. A 10,000 square feet (930 m^{2}) addition was added to the west elevation. The main challenge during the renovation was the removal of the library stacks, which had a structural function in the building.

The interior was reconfigured to serve its new functions as an architecture building and to correspond with its original classical character. The main lobby became an exhibit hall, flanked on the north by the Architecture Library and on the south by a new lecture hall. The basement contained a darkroom and classrooms, and the mezzanine and second floor were converted into classroom space. The renovation itself was a learning experience for the architectural students.

Upon competition of the renovation, the new Architecture Hall hosted its first classes on November 9, 1964, while finishing touches were still being added. The formal dedication occurred on May 1, 1965, presided by Rev. Theodore Hesburgh, the university president, and Pietro Belluschi, dean of the School of Architecture at the Massachusetts Institute of Technology.

In 1973, the building was added to the National Register of Historic Places.

=== Bond Hall of Architecture (1995–2019) ===
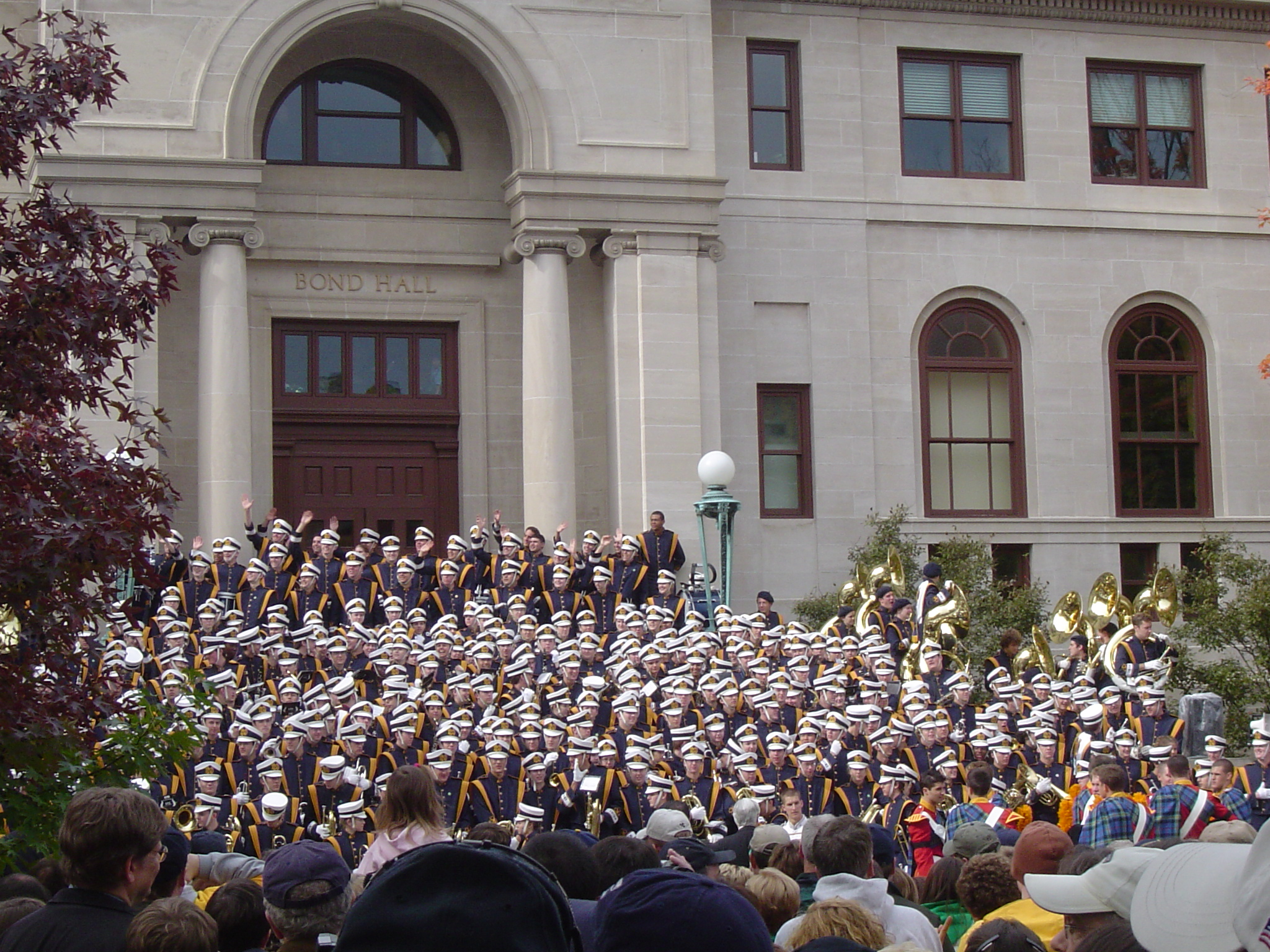
Concert on the Steps at Bond Hall, by the Band of the Fighting Irish

A subsequent renovation occurred in 1995, during which the building was closed for 18 months. The $12 million renovation was made possible by a $5 million gift from William W. Bond Jr. ('50) and his wife Joanne. The Architecture department moved temporarily to the Hayes-Healy Center and Hurley Hall, which had been vacated by the School of Business for its move to the newly constructed Mendoza College of Business. The renovation also included an American Renaissance style 20,000 square-foot addition on the west side designed by Ellerbe Becket under the guidance of architecture chairman Thomas Gordon Smith.

The building was rededicated as Bond Hall of Architecture on March 21, 1997, presided by Rev. Edward Malloy. The speakers included internationally renowned architects Allan Greenberg, Elizabeth Plater-Zyberk, and Demetri Porphyrios, who received honorary degrees from the School of Architecture.

On November 9, 2018, the university dedicated the Matthew and Joyce Walsh Family Hall of Architecture, and the School of Architecture moved in the new building in the winter of 2019.

=== Current (2019–) ===
Starting in 2019, Bond Hall houses a student-learning center on campus, shared with the nearby Coleman Morse Hall which includes a learning center for STEM freshmen. Additionally, it houses the Center for Academic Transformation and Excellence, the Institute for Latino Studies (ILS), Flatley Center for Undergraduate Scholarly Engagement, and the Center for the Study of Languages and Cultures (CSLC).

== Architecture ==
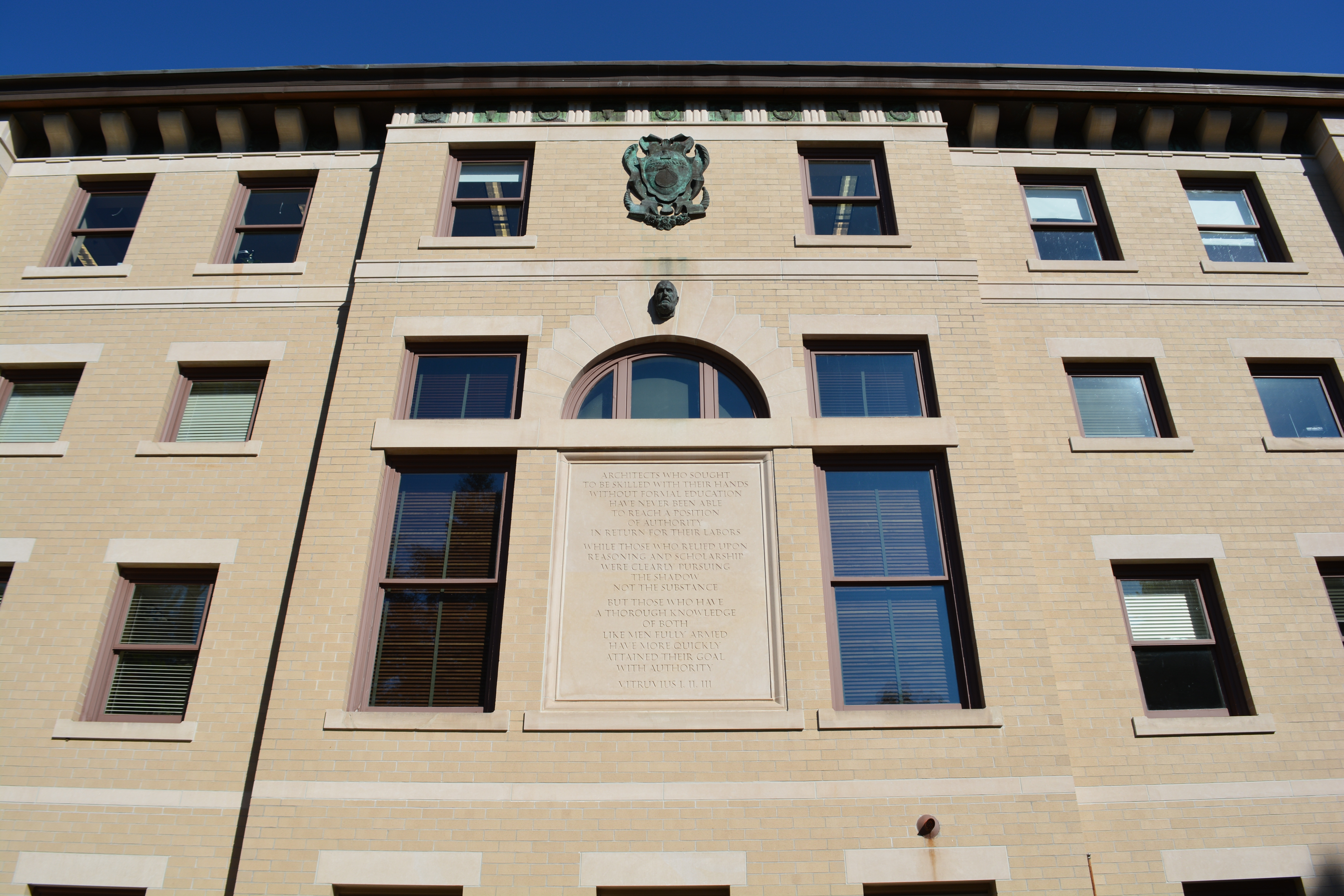
The back side of Bond Hall with a bust of Vitruvius and a quote from his Ten Books of Architecture

The building is built in Indiana limestone, three stories high with an intermediate mezzanine level, low pitched green tile roof. A very careful Renaissance building that marks an early response to the Renaissance revival of the early twentieth century associated with "Ecole de Beaux Arts Classicism." A serious building with triumphal arch entrance and a grand flight of exterior stairs; the stairs are flanked by large lamps on copper tripods. Simple columns with Ionic capitols. The building is unified by a continuous cornice with a dentil course and egg and dart molding below that. Inside there is a large oval foyer and high skylighted room beyond, currently used as a display gallery. Marble has been used on the floors and some walls. Public spaces carry the classical motif throughout in moldings, panels, engaged columns and pilasters with appropriate capitols and bases. The west side of Bond Hall, opposite the main entrance, features a semi circular courtyard. On the facade, there is a sculpture of Vitruvius by Miklos Simon. The bust stands over an inscription featuring a quote from his De architectura:

Architects who sought to be skilled with their hands without formal education have never been able to reach a position of authority in return for their labors; while those who relied only upon Reasoning and Scholarship were clearly pursuing the shadow, not the substance. But those who have a thorough knowledge of both, like men fully armed, have more quickly attained their goals with authority (Vitruvius, Ten Books on Architecture, I.II.II).
