= Maurice Culot =

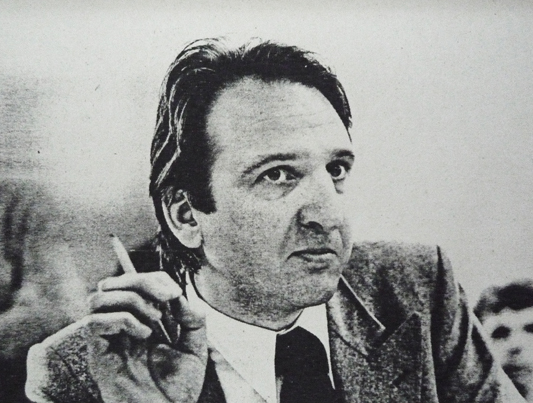
Maurice Culot in 1980

Maurice Culot (born 7 December 1939) is a Belgian architect. He is the winner of the 2019 Driehaus Architecture Prize.
