= Sebastian Treese =

German architect

- Born: 1977 (age 48–49); Mainz, Germany
- Education: Berlin University of the Arts
- Occupation: Architect
- Awards: Richard H. Driehaus Prize 2021
- Website: https://www.sebastiantreese.de

Sebastian Treese (born 1977) is an architect from Germany based in Berlin. His architectural office is known for creating New Classical architecture that adapts to its urban surroundings, depending on context. Treese was awarded the renowned Driehaus Architecture Prize in 2021.

After finishing school in Osnabrück Treese studied architecture at the Berlin University of the Arts from 1997 to 2004. Among his mentors were Adolf Krischanitz, Hilmer & Sattler and Hans Kollhoff. He started his first architecture office in 2008 with Berlin-based architect Fritz Neumeyer (born 1977), before establishing Treese architects in 2011. He finished notable buildings like Eisenzahn 1 in Berlin, a private residence in Grunewald with Robert A. M. Stern, the Donkwall old town project in Kempen, the Elbchaussee 368 ensemble in Hamburg Nienstedten, as well as Greifweg 14–16 and Achenbachstrasse 43/45 in Düsseldorf-Oberkassel.

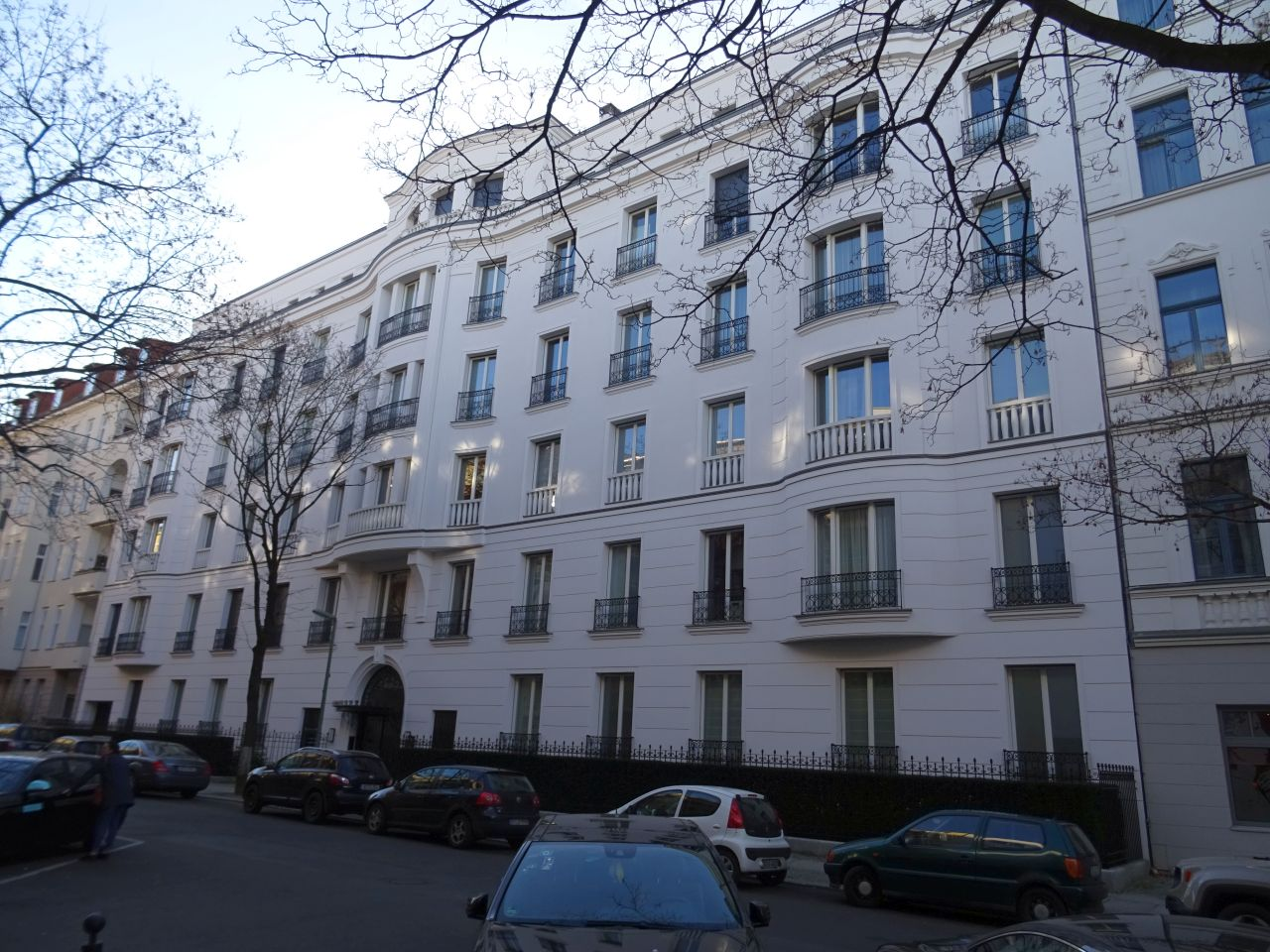
Eisenzahnstrasse 1 in Berlin-Wilmersdorf, completed in 2016

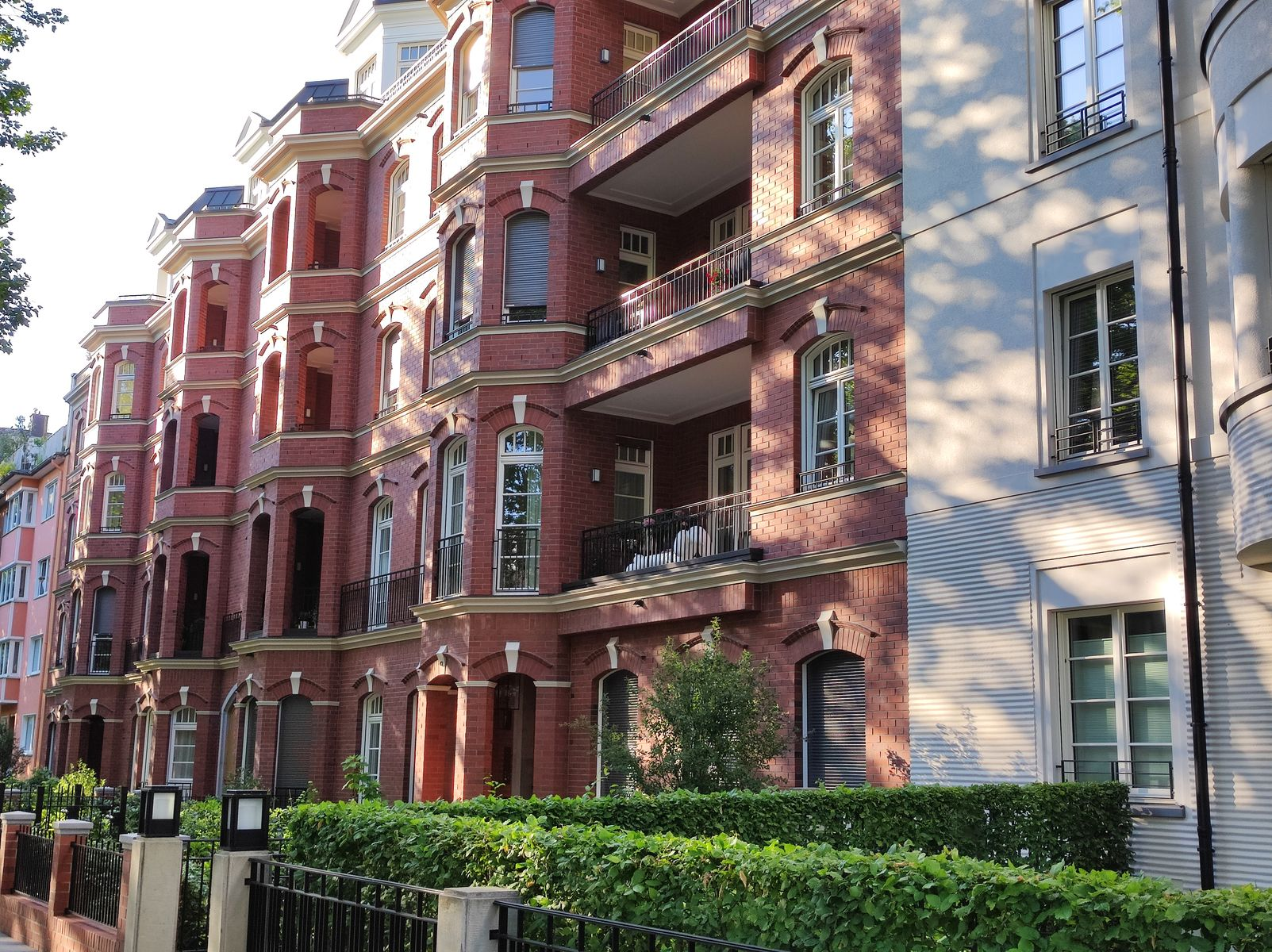
Achenbachstrasse 43/45 in Düsseldorf, completed in 2022
