= Notre Dame School of Architecture =

Architecture school at the University of Notre Dame

- Type: Private
- Established: 1982; 44 years ago (1898; 128 years ago as a department in the College of Engineering)
- Academic affiliations: NAAB
- Dean: Stefanos Polyzoides
- Faculty: 41
- Undergraduates: 200
- Postgraduates: 30
- Location: Notre Dame, Indiana, U.S. 41.6951°N 86.2350°W
- Website: architecture.nd.edu

The University of Notre Dame School of Architecture is the architecture school at the University of Notre Dame. It was the first Catholic university in America to offer a degree in architecture, beginning in 1898.

== History ==
Architecture as a discipline was taught at the university as early as 1869, but it was not until 1898 that an architecture degree was offered. The first architecture graduate was Cuban Eugenio Rayneri Piedra who earned his degree in 1904. From 1931 to 1963, the Law School was housed in what is today Crowley Hall on Main Quad. The building was constructed in 1893 and hosted the Institute of Technology until it was damaged by fire in 1916; after a restoration it housed the Notre Dame Law School until 1931 before hosting the Architecture Department.

When the new Hesburgh Library was opened in 1963, the old Lemmonier Library (now Bond Hall) was given to the Department of Architecture. The head of the department, Frank Montana, designed plans to renovate the interiors to fit the new needs of the Architecture school. The original limestone exterior with Ionic detailing on the east side was preserved and restored. A 10,000 square feet (930 m^{2}) addition was also added to the west elevation. The main challenge during the renovation was the removal of the library stacks, which had a structural function in the building.

The interior was reconfigured to serve its new functions as an architecture building and to correspond with its original classical character. The main lobby became an exhibit hall, flanked on the north by the Architecture Library and on the south by a new lecture hall. The basement contained a darkroom and classrooms, and the mezzanine and second floor were converted into classroom space. The renovation itself was a learning experience for the architectural students themselves.

Upon competition of the renovation, the new Architecture Hall hosted its first classes on 9 November 1964, while finishing touches were still being added. The formal dedication occurred on 1 May 1965, presided by Rev. Theodore Hesburgh, the university president, and Pietro Belluschi, dean of the School of Architecture at the Massachusetts Institute of Technology.

In 1982, the architecture department became the School of Architecture and in 1994 it became a free-standing entity independent from the College of Engineering.

The building was further renovated in 1995, during which the building was closed for 18 months. The $12 million renovation was made possible by a $5 million gift from William W. Bond Jr. ('50) and his wife Joanne. The School of Architecture moved temporarily to the Hayes-Healy Center and Hurley Hall, which had been vacated by the School of Business for its move to the newly constructed business building on DeBartolo Quad. The renovation also included an American Renaissance-style 20,000 square feet (1,900 m^{2}) addition on the west side, designed by Ellerbe Becket under the guidance of architecture chairman Thomas Gordon Smith. The building was rededicated as Bond Hall of Architecture on Friday, 21 March 1997, presided by Rev. Edward Malloy, with speakers including internationally renowned architects Allan Greenberg, Elizabeth Plater-Zyberk, and Demetri Porphyrios, who received honorary degrees from the School of Architecture.

In 2016 construction began on a new building to house the School called The Matthew and Joyce Walsh Family Hall. The building was dedicated on November 9, 2018, and the School of Architecture moved into its new location in the following months.

== Academics ==
=== Admissions ===
The University of Notre Dame School of Architecture is accredited by the National Architectural Accrediting Board. Any undergraduate student admitted as an undergraduate to the University of Notre Dame may declare an architecture major.

=== Rome Studies Program ===
The Rome Studies Program was founded in 1969 as a required third-year study abroad program by Francesco "Frank" Montana, Department Chair from 1950 to 1972.

=== Pedagogy ===
The School of Architecture considers its pedagogy's goals, content, and methodological rigor, as well as its commitment to both substance and change, as part of a legitimate campaign to restore architecture to its millennial role: generating the most diverse possible human habitat with reason, beauty, intelligence, justice, and peace in mind.

The programs encompass the ecological, the urban, and the architectural at the entire constructional range of the built world: from buildings, streets, gardens, and parks to neighborhoods, towns, and cities. Our students are exposed to the best design and building traditions of our country and of many others throughout the world, especially those where architects and builders have generated notable places over time. They are taught to consider these stellar accomplishments of past global cultures as foundational precedents and to use them wisely in their cultural sphere as ingredients in current architectural practice. The strictly artistic or technical dimensions of an architectural education cannot be divorced from the ideological ones.

Students are taught to direct their aspirations, skills, and imaginations to do good in the world through their projects and practices. We guide them to discover the standards of design excellence of our discipline and to ensure that they understand the rules and virtues necessary to act within their context.

Faculty use these teaching goals within a Catholic university perspective — a community dedicated to the discovery, exploration, and service of truths. The Catholic social mission of the University of Notre Dame illuminates every aspect of our pedagogy: protecting the dignity of all human beings, engaging in community building, practicing solidarity with those in need, and subsidiarity in democratizing decision-making across the board. We consider this set of values and obligations to be universal and essential in ensuring a civilized, empathetic, peaceful, and prosperous world. It is this understanding of the true, the good, and the beautiful that allows our academic community to also recognize these truths wherever they may encounter them during their academic journey, including in other religious or philosophical traditions and in the experience of civic and everyday life.

At Notre Dame, architecture and urbanism do more than provide the shelter where we live; they shape the public and private realms and therefore the way in which we inhabit our planet and develop our cultures, economies, and futures.

Facts:

1 of 34 institutions in the U.S. offering NAAB-accredited programs for both B.Arch and M.Arch

Graduates are ranked first in the country for passing the licensing exam on their first try, outperforming every other school in the U.S.

== Facilities ==
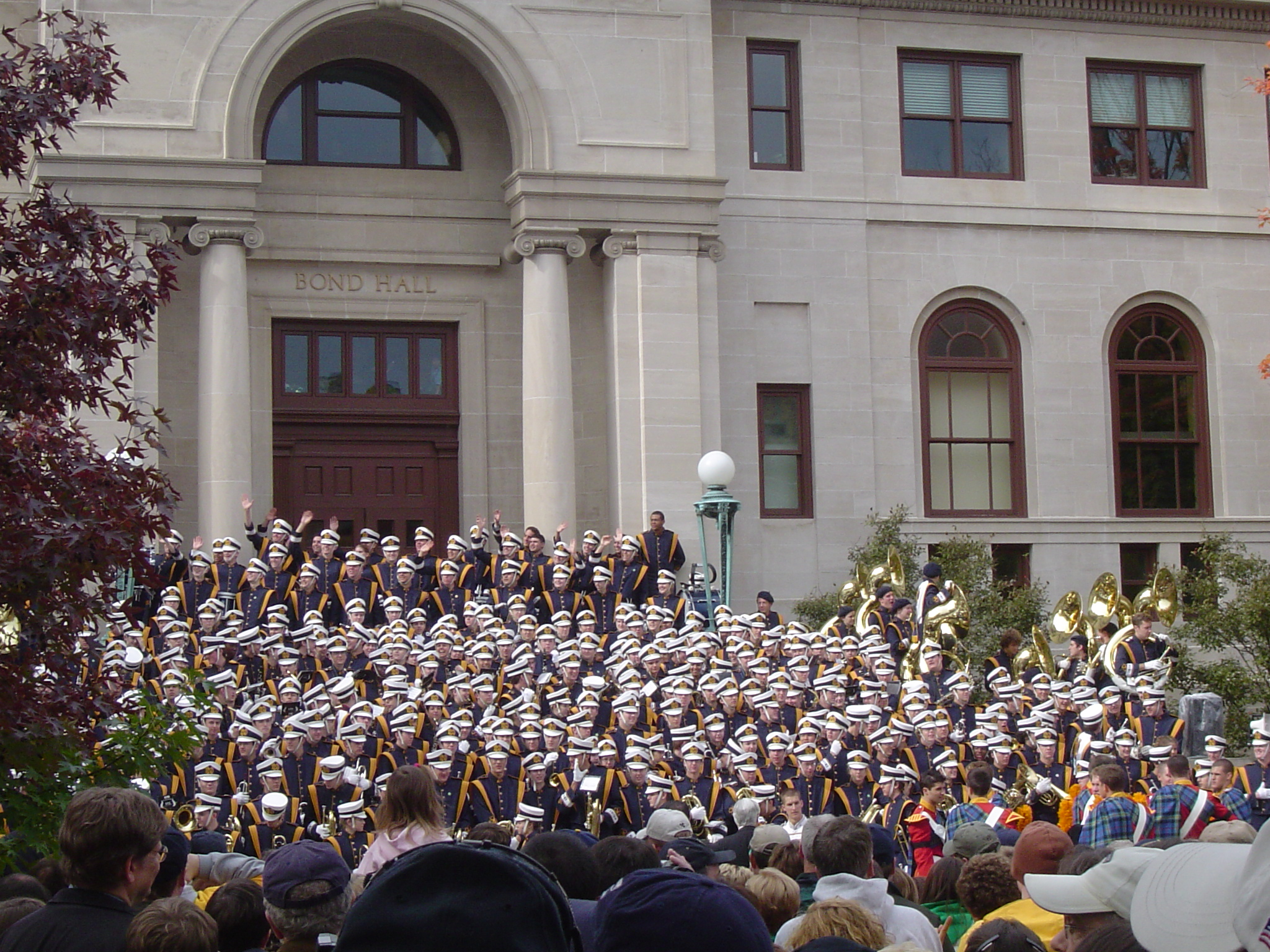
The front of Bond Hall, playing host to the university band

Until 2019 it was housed in Bond Hall, a building on the Notre Dame campus formerly known as the Lemonnier Library. The building served as the principal library of the entire campus from its construction in 1917 until Hesburgh Memorial Library was constructed in 1964. The building was renovated and expanded to become Bond Hall between 1995 and 1997 under the guidance of Thomas Gordon Smith, the Department Chair from 1989 to 1998 and current faculty member. Bond Hall contained studio space for both undergraduate and students, several classrooms, and an auditorium that seats approximately 100 people. Bond Hall was then repurposed to house a student-learning center on campus together with Coleman Morse Hall, the Notre Dame Graduate School, the Institute for Latino Studies and the Flatley Center for Undergraduate Scholarly Engagement will move into Bond, along with other units and a new learning initiative for freshmen in STEM.

=== Walsh Family Hall of Architecture ===
The School of Architecture is housed in the Walsh Family Hall of Architecture. Construction started in October 2016 and was completed in January 2019, and the 110,000-square-foot building was designed by John Simpson, the structural engineering done by Thornton Tomasetti and built by the Walsh Group. It was named after a $33 million donation by Matthew Walsh. The architecture style is New Classicism and New Urbanism, of which John Simpson is a major figure having won the school's own Driehaus Architecture Prize, and is inspired by the classical elements taught in the École des Beaux-Arts. According to these principles, the building is spartan and durable in its construction materials to maximize functionality, durability, and economy, while having more elaborate and decorated styles in the main entrance, hall of casts, auditoriums and the library. It was built in the southern side of campus, in the new arts district, close to the O’Neill Hall, the DeBartolo Performing Arts Center, Charles B. Hayes Family Sculpture Park and the planned Raclin Murphy Museum of Art. The building is centered around a court and provides architecture studios in a two-story wing along the north; a library on the east; with an auditorium and exhibition galleries along the main circulation spine, which is in the form of a Greek stoa. The entrance to the is marked by an Ionic portico, while a tower at the center of the court is positioned to stand out in the views from the university's main entrance and to facilitate access to the external amphitheater.

The courtyard of the building features a 14 ft sculpture of Leon Battista Alberti, architect and key feature of the Italian Renaissance, by Scottish sculptor Alexander Stoddart, the artist's tallest single figure. Alberti's ideas of balance and harmony between the individual and the city are inspiration for the new urbanism philosophy taught at the school.

=== Furniture Design concentration and UND ===
West Lake Hall, which opened in the fall of 2012, is located on the west edge of campus and holds the School's woodshop. Classes for the Furniture Design concentration were held there until the Walsh Family Hall of Architecture was built.

The university also maintains a Global Gateway in Rome, Italy, with two locations in the historic city center. Included in the building is considerable room for the School's Rome Studies Program, as well as space for other study-abroad students, Notre Dame International, the Notre Dame Club of Italy, and various academic conferences. From 1986 to 2013, the School of Architecture had a building located on Via Monterone, which consisted of parts of two Roman palazzi. Facilities include studio space for approximately 50–55 students, offices for faculty and staff, an auditorium/meeting room, a small library, a computer cluster, and a student kitchen and dining area. Students live nearby in a hotel just off of Campo de' Fiori. The year-long Rome program was founded in 1969 by the late Frank Montana and is now a requirement for all third-year architecture students.

== The Richard H. Driehaus Prize at the University of Notre Dame ==
Since 2003, Richard H. Driehaus and the University of Notre Dame School of Architecture have together awarded the annual Richard H. Driehaus Prize at the University of Notre Dame for a lifetime of achievement in classical and traditional architecture and sustainable urbanism. The Driehaus Prize has been presented to architects representing various classical traditions, whose artistic impact reflects their commitment to cultural and environmental conservation. Past winners include Léon Krier, Allan Greenberg, Elizabeth Plater-Zyberk and Andres Duany, Abdel-Wahed El-Wakil, and Robert A.M. Stern.

== Summer programs ==
The School often sponsors summer programs to introduce students to international traditional and classical architecture and urbanism. Previous programs have traveled to China, Japan, Cuba, Portugal, Greece, Italy, and the United Kingdom. The programs explore each country's best practices in urban development, sustainable architecture and environmental planning.

The China program, typically conducted every other year, look at Asia's architectural traditions and its influence on modern urban living. The program examines how architects and planners have responded to evolving social demands compared to their counterparts in the West. New construction is also studied to learn how the country reflects that heritage even as it evolves.

The School of Architecture also provides high school students with the opportunity to study architecture at Notre Dame for two weeks in the summer. The Career Discovery program is intended to help participants decide whether or not they want to pursue architecture in college, and if so, how they should prepare during their junior and senior years of high school.

== Notable alumni ==
- Gene Bertoncini
- John Burgee
- Francis D.K. Ching
- Marianne Cusato
- David Mayernik
- Eugenio Rayneri Piedra
- Dan Rockhill
