= Michael Lykoudis =

American architect

Michael Lykoudis is an architect, urban designer and consultant, known for his work as dean of the University of Notre Dame School of Architecture and a co-founder of the Driehaus Prize at the University of Notre Dame. He is a member of the College of Fellows of the American Institute of Architects.

== Early life ==
Michael Lykoudis was born in Boston, Massachusetts in 1954 after his parents moved to the United States from Greece to pursue PhDs. He grew up in West Lafayette, Indiana and spent his most of his summers in Athens, Greece throughout his childhood.

He received a Bachelor of Architecture from Cornell University and a Master of Architecture from the University of Illinois at Urbana-Champaign.

== Career ==
Lykoudis worked for architecture firms in Miami, Athens, New York City and New Haven before becoming a faculty member and director of undergraduate studies at University of Notre Dame School of Architecture in 1991. He served as assistant chair and chair for several years until becoming the first dean of the school of architecture in 2004, a position he held until 2020.

As dean, Lykoudis was instrumental in enhancing urbanism in the curriculum, and the expanding of the graduate program. He instituted an enhanced international travel program for students to Asia, South and Central America and Europe. He led groups of students in several large projects, including a new urban design plan for the Central Business District of the University of Notre Dame's home city of South Bend and the master planning of the fire-ravaged town of Mati, Greece.

Lykoudis has co-curated several international exhibitions on architecture and urbanism including The Art of Building Cities, Chicago 1995 and L'Altra Modernita (The other Modern) in Bologna Italy. He has written numerous essays on the topic of traditional architecture and urbanism and lectured in the United States and abroad.

== Awards ==
In 2020, Lykoudis received the Seaside Prize, "not only for his contributions to education, and for his outstanding stewardship of the school, but also for the ties that have emerged during his deanship between the school and the town of Seaside." He also was given the 2020 Arthur Ross Board of Trustees Award for Excellence in the Classical Tradition.

== Personal life ==
Lykoudis shares his time between South Bend, Indiana and Athens, Greece.
