= Ben Pentreath =

English architect and interior designer

- Born: Benjamin Toby Pentreath; November 1971 (age 54–55); Dorchester, England
- Education: University of Edinburgh
- Spouse: Charlie McCormick (m. 2015)
- Website: www.benpentreath.com

Benjamin Toby Pentreath OBE (born November 1971) is an English architectural and interior designer who runs Ben Pentreath Ltd, a RIBA chartered practice, and Pentreath & Hall, which sells home furnishings. Country Life called him one of the "best country house architects in Britain".

Pentreath is responsible for much of the development since 2009 of Poundbury. He has also done other work for the Duchy of Cornwall, including a development in Truro.

As an interior designer, he has worked for the Princess of Wales on the refurbishment of Anmer Hall.

== Early life ==
Pentreath was born in Dorchester and grew up in an old stone barn. He graduated from the University of Edinburgh in 1995 with a degree in Art History. He took up further studies at the Institute of Architecture. Pentreath moved to Norfolk to work for architectural designer Charles Morris, and then to New York for five years, before returning to England in 2003. He set up his Bloomsbury-based architecture and design firm in 2004. This was followed by his design store Pentreath & Hall in 2008.

== Personal life ==
Pentreath married New Zealand florist Charlie McCormick in 2015. The couple live between a Georgian flat in Bloomsbury, London; the Old Parsonage in Littlebredy, Dorset; and a bothy on the Argyll coast of Scotland.

== Bibliography ==
=== Books ===
- English Decoration: Timeless Inspiration for the Contemporary Home. London: Ryland Peters & Small. 2012. p. 189. ISBN 9781849752664.
- English Houses: Inspirational Interiors from City Apartments to Country Manor Houses. London: Ryland Peters & Small. 2016. p. 223. ISBN 9781849757539.
- An English Vision: Traditional Architecture and Decoration for Today (2024)
- A Year at the Parsonage: The Story of a House & Garden (2026) with Charlie McCormick

=== Contributions ===
- Get Your House Right: Architectural Elements to Use & Avoid (2007) by Marianne Cusato
- Three Classicists (2010), catalogue for Royal Institute of British Architects exhibition
