= John Simpson (architect) =

British architect (born 1954)

- Born: November 9, 1954 (age 71); England
- Alma mater: The Bartlett, University College London
- Occupations: Architect, urban planner
- Awards: Driehaus Architecture Prize (2026); Arthur Ross Award (2008)
- Practice: John Simpson Architects
- Website: www.johnsimpsonarchitects.com

John Simpson CVO RIBA (born 9 November 1954) is a British architect, designer, and urban planner who works primarily within the classical and traditional architecture traditions. He is a prominent figure in the New Classical architecture movement.

== Education and early career ==
Simpson attended The Bartlett School of Architecture at University College London. He established his practice, John Simpson Architects, based in London.

Simpson first came to widespread public prominence in 1990 with his masterplan and counter-proposal for Paternoster Square next to St Paul's Cathedral in the City of London. Championed by the then Prince of Wales (now King Charles III), Simpson's design proposed restoring the historic urban grain around the cathedral, allowing Wren's dome to dominate the skyline framed by church spires. Featured in the Prince's book and exhibition *A Vision of Britain*, the project served as a watershed moment that helped jumpstart the traditional classical movement in British urban planning.

== Major works ==
Simpson has designed numerous high-profile public, academic, and residential buildings internationally:

- The King's Gallery (formerly the Queen's Gallery) at Buckingham Palace, London – new gallery spaces for the Royal Collection, opened by Queen Elizabeth II in 2002.
- The Royal College of Music, London – new recital rooms, recording studios, and museum facilities (opened 2021; winner of the Georgian Group Diaphoros Prize and the RIBA London Award).
- The Walsh Family Hall of Architecture at the University of Notre Dame, Indiana, USA – the new home for the university's School of Architecture, completed in 2020.
- The Defence and National Rehabilitation Centre at Stanford Hall, near Loughborough – a national rehabilitation facility for injured service personnel.
- The University Arms Hotel, Cambridge – neoclassical hotel restoration and redesign, opened in 2018.
- Masterplans and new quadrangles at Lady Margaret Hall, Oxford (2010–2017) and Peterhouse, Cambridge (The Whittle Building, opened 2015).
- McCrum Yard at Eton College – new schools, an assembly hall modeled on ancient council chambers, and the Jafar Gallery museum for Greek and Egyptian antiquities (opened 2015).
- The Brownsword Building and market hall at Poundbury, Dorset – the first public building completed in the model village development (1999).
- The Carhart Mansion on East 95th Street, New York City – combining two landmark buildings into luxury apartments (completed 2006), praised by the New York Landmarks Preservation Commission as the city's first traditionally classical building constructed since the 1960s.

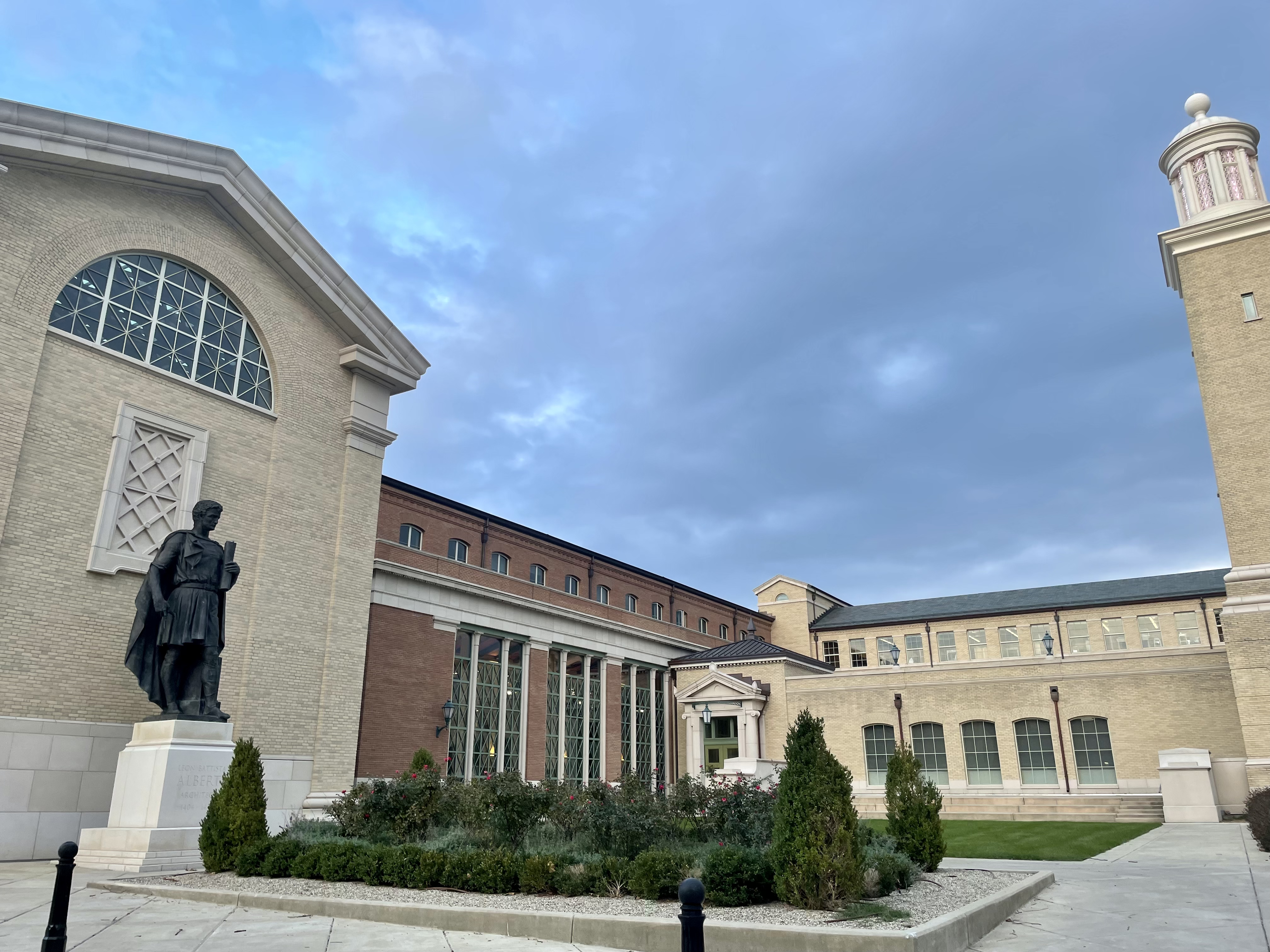
The Walsh Family Hall of Architecture at the University of Notre Dame

== Academic career ==
Simpson has held numerous academic appointments:

- Professor of Architecture at the University of Buckingham (appointed 2018).
- Director of the University of Buckingham Summer School in Architecture and Urban Design (appointed 2019).
- Visiting professor at the Department of Architecture, University of Cambridge, and fellow at Gonville and Caius College, Cambridge.
- Visiting lecturer, juror, and critic at the School of Architecture at the University of Notre Dame.

== Awards and honors ==
- Arthur Ross Award (2008)
- Appointed Commander of the Royal Victorian Order (CVO)
- Driehaus Architecture Prize (2026) – awarded by the University of Notre Dame in recognition of his lifetime achievements in traditional architecture and urbanism.

== Publications ==
- David Watkin and Richard John, The Queen’s Gallery, Buckingham Palace and Other Works. Papadakis, 2002. ISBN 1-901092-39-9.
- David Watkin, The Architecture of John Simpson: The Timeless Language of Classicism. Rizzoli, 2016. ISBN 978-0-8478-4869-0.
- Clive Aslet, The Academy: Celebrating the work of John Simpson at the Walsh Family Hall, University of Notre Dame, Indiana. Triglyph Books, 2020. ISBN 978-1-9163554-2-2.
- Clive Aslet, Building Beautiful: Classical Houses by John Simpson. Rizzoli, 2021. ISBN 978-0-8478-7063-9.

== See also ==
- New Classical architecture
- Traditional architecture
