= Allan Greenberg =

American architect (born 1938)

- Born: September 7, 1938 (age 87); Johannesburg, South Africa
- Citizenship: United States (since 1973)
- Education: University of the Witwatersrand; Yale University (MArch)
- Occupation: Architect
- Spouse: Judith Seligson

Allan Greenberg (born September 7, 1938) is an American architect and one of the leading classical architects of the twenty-first century, in a style known as New Classical Architecture.

He was the originator and leading practitioner of "canonical classicism," one of many design responses to postmodernism emerging in the mid-1970s. According to Paul Goldberger, architecture critic for The New York Times, Greenberg's “life’s work has been a mission to establish the validity of classicism as an architectural language in our time.” In addition to his architecture, Greenberg’s articles, teaching, and lectures have exerted a strong influence on the study and practice of contemporary classicism. In 2006, he was the first American to be awarded the Richard H. Driehaus Prize for Classical Architecture in recognition of his major contributions to architectural design and scholarship. The prize is awarded annually "to a living architect whose work embodies the principles of traditional and classical architecture and urbanism in contemporary society and creates a positive, long-lasting cultural, environmental, and artistic impact." George Hersey, author and professor of Art History at Yale University, wrote:

Greenberg is the most knowing, most serious practitioner of Classicism currently on the scene in this country. . . . Greenberg belongs in the succession of Charles Follen McKim, Daniel Burnham, Henry Bacon, John Russell Pope, and Arthur Brown. And above all he belongs to the succession of Greece and Rome, of Vignola and Sanmicheli, of Vanvitelli, Ledoux, and Labrouste, to the visionary company of those who play the great game of Classicism.

== Early life ==
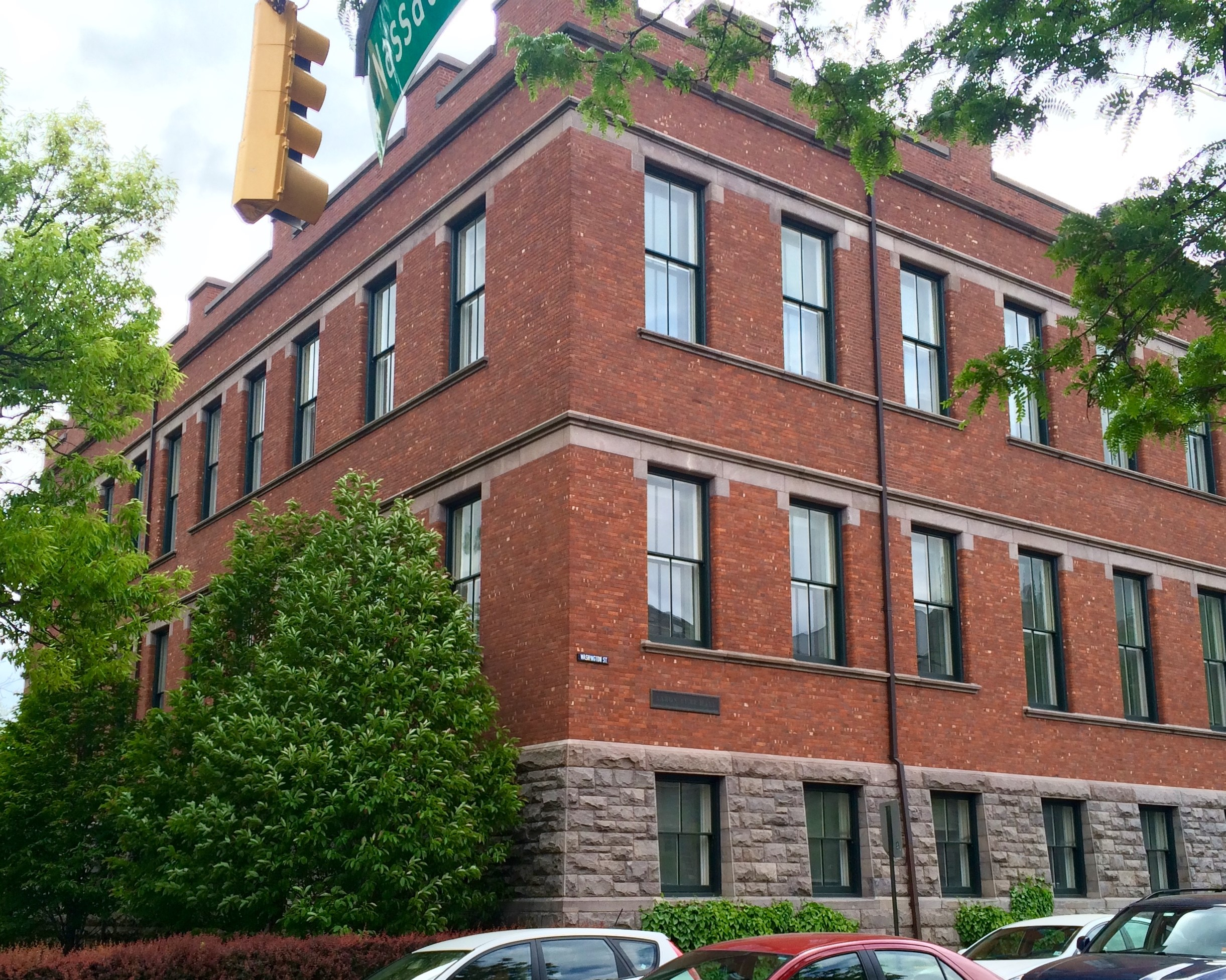
Aaron Burr Hall, Princeton University(2003–2005)

Greenberg was born on September 7, 1938 in Johannesburg, South Africa.

He was educated at the University of the Witwatersrand, where he studied classical, Gothic, and modern architecture. He attributes his thorough grounding in architectural history to the rigors of his study there. Professors required students to memorize and draw the plans of famous buildings at will.

== Career ==
Following a short working career in South Africa, Greenberg moved to London with the intention of studying there, and briefly considered taking a job with Le Corbusier. After a short stay in England he left for Denmark to work in the studio of the leading Scandinavian modernist architect Jørn Utzon during the design of the Sydney Opera House. He subsequently took a job in Helsinki with Viljo Revell, perhaps the best known Finnish architect after Alvar Aalto, whom Greenberg admired greatly.

In 1963, he moved his Danish wife and young family to America. He was admitted to the architecture program at Yale, headed by the Brutalist architect Paul Marvin Rudolph. Like fellow foreign students Norman Foster and Richard Rogers, Greenberg sought a fresh approach to Modernism in a country that was advancing faster than Europe in technology and architectural theory. After receiving his Master of Architecture degree from Yale University in 1965, he spent two years in the City of New Haven’s Redevelopment Agency and later served as Architectural Consultant to Connecticut’s Chief Justice from 1967 to 1979. He taught at Yale under deans Charles W. Moore and Herman Spiegel, watching the student upheavals of the late 1960s, and helped to develop the school's undergraduate major in architecture. It was during the early 1970s that Greenberg became disillusioned with orthodox Modernism, turning instead to postmodernist critiques offered by Yale colleagues Robert Venturi and Denise Scott Brown.

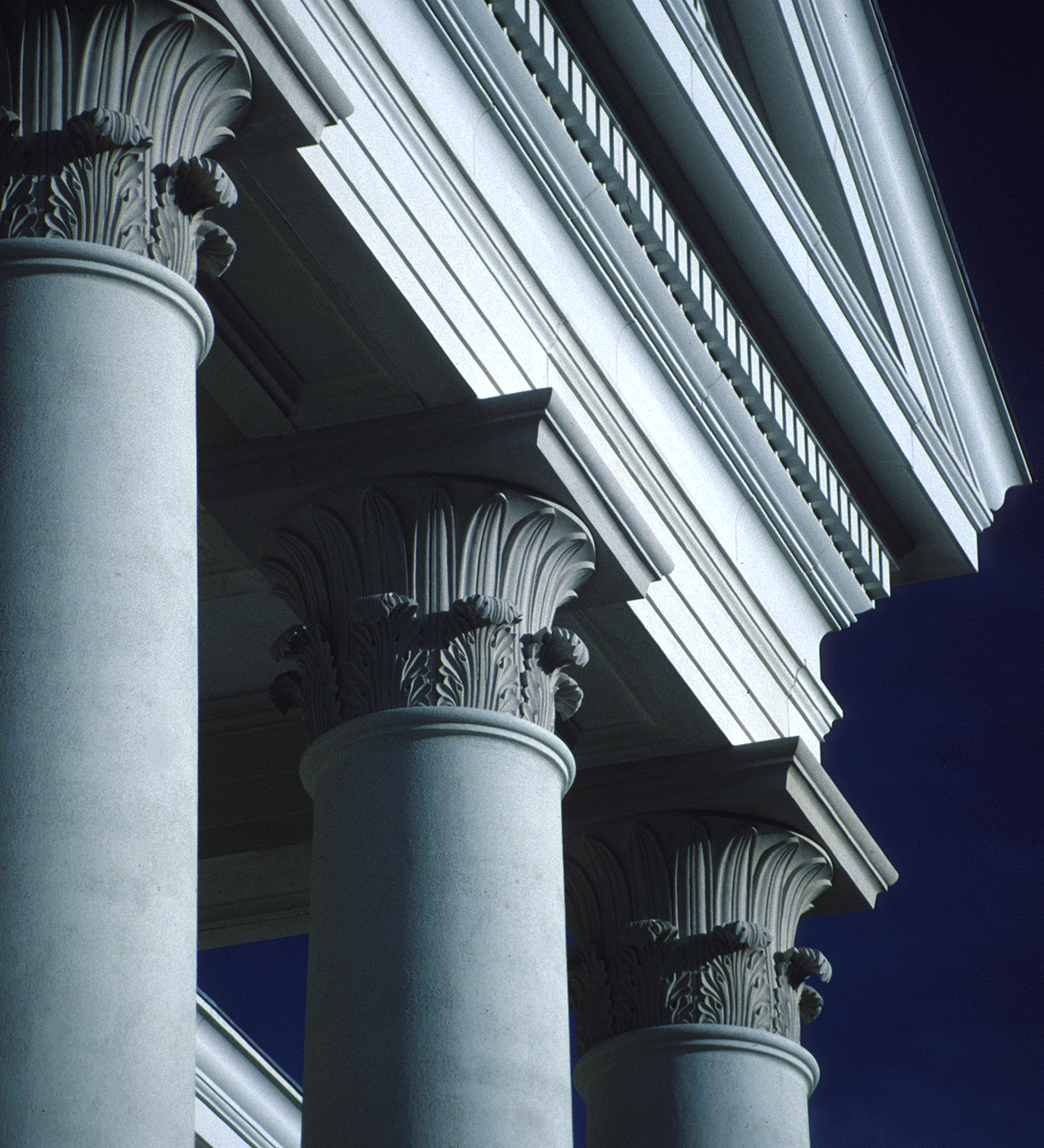

Greenberg's work in the mid-1970s was influenced both by the American "grays" (Moore, Venturi, Robert A.M. Stern, et al.) with whom he became associated, and by modern classicists such as Edwin Lutyens and Mott B. Schmidt. But as he came to better understand the achievements of these 20th-century masters, he increasingly pushed his work toward a more traditional vocabulary. In 1980, Greenberg contributed a Postmodern architectural facade to The Presence of the Past exhibition at the Venice Biennale, which include facades by many architects engaged in Postmodernism. His breakthrough projects came in the early 1980s with his design of a large country house for Peter and Sandra Brant in Greenwich, Connecticut (a commission wrested from Venturi), and George Shultz's extensive classical suite at the State Department in Washington, D.C. After their publication Greenberg's office flourished, and many students interested in traditional design came to New Haven to work with him. No architect in America has had a more profound influence on the younger generation of traditional architects who are practicing today.

Greenberg has also taught at the University of Pennsylvania, the Division of Historic Preservation at Columbia University, and the University of Notre Dame.

Allan Greenberg, Architect, LLC was established in 1972 and had offices in Alexandria, Virginia and New York City before Greenberg retired in 2021. The firm's work covered a broad range of buildings in the United States and overseas. Projects included master plans, feasibility studies, new construction, renovations, restorations, and interior and furniture design for academic, institutional, religious, commercial, residential, and retail clients.

Greenberg wrote both scholarly and popular books and articles on the dynamic and enduring qualities of traditional architecture and design. His extensive body of published work includes the books George Washington, Architect (1999), The Architecture of Democracy: American Architecture and the Legacy of the Revolution (2006), and Lutyens and the Modern Movement (2007). A monograph of his work appeared in 1995. More recently, a monograph "Allan Greenberg: Classical Architect" was published by Rizzoli in 2013.

== Personal life ==
Greenberg received his U.S. citizenship in 1973. He is married to the painter Judith Seligson, his second wife.

== Major projects ==
- State Library and Supreme Court Building, addition (in association with Russell Gibson von Dohlen, Hartford, Connecticut, 1970)
- Superior Court Building (Manchester, Connecticut, 1979–1980)
- Bergdorf Goodman Building, new façade (New York, New York, 1983–1984)
- Treaty Ceremony Room, Antechambers, and Reception Rooms, United States Department of State (Washington D.C., 1985–1986)
- Offices of the Secretary of State, United States Department of State (Washington D.C., 1987–89)
- The News Building (Athens, Georgia, 1988–1992)
- J. Wilson Newman Pavilion, The Miller Center of Public Affairs, University of Virginia (Charlottesville, Virginia, 1988–1990)
- Tercentenary Hall (now McGlothlin-Street Hall), College of William & Mary (Williamsburg, Virginia, 1989–1995)
- Gore Hall, University of Delaware (Newark, Delaware, 1995–1998)
- Tommy Hilfiger Flagship Store (now Brooks Brothers) (Beverly Hills, California, 1995–1997)
- Unicorn Mining Headquarters (London, Kentucky, 1997–1999)
- Humanities Building, Rice University (Houston, Texas, 1997–2000)
- Supreme Court Historical Society, renovation (Washington, D.C., 1998–1999)
- DuPont Hall, University of Delaware (Newark, Delaware, 1998–2002)
- Aaron Burr Hall, Princeton University (Princeton, New Jersey, 2003–2005)
- Brockman Hall for Opera, Rice University (Houston, Texas, 2017-2020)

== Selected bibliography ==
- "A Classical Touch for an Unruly Façade.” New York Times (Nov. 6, 2006).
- Clarke, Gerald. “Design Dialogue.” Architectural Digest (July 2010): 132-39.
- Clarke, Gerald. “In the Georgian Fashion.” Architectural Digest (October 2009): 132-39.
- Conroy, S. Claire. “At Home with the Past: Allan Greenberg Makes the Familiar Fresh Again.” Residential Architect (September/October 2002): 56-67.
- Gagné, Nicole V. “Allan Greenberg.” Traditional Building 17:5 (September/October 2004): 16.
- Goldberger, Paul. “In Perpetuum.” Architectural Record 174 (April 1986): 110-21.
- Langdon, Philip. “Modern Classics: Allan Greenberg’s Houses Reflect the Revival of the Classical Tradition.” The Atlantic 265.1 (January 1990): 86+.
- Lubow, Arthur. “The Ionic Man.” Departures No. 57 (May/June 1999): 156-63, 220.
- Reiss, Gwen North. “A Class Act.” Connecticut Cottages & Gardens (January 2007).
- Rybczynski, Witold. “Something Old, Something New: A Prize-Winning Architect at Princeton.” Slate Magazine (Feb. 1, 2006).
- Schmertz, M. F. “Design for Diplomacy.” Architectural Record 173 No. 12 (1985): 152-59.
- Ward, Logan. “Old Town Revival.” Southern Accents (Sept.-Oct. 2005): 94-100.
- Westfall, C. W. “Allan Greenberg and the Difficult Whole of Architecture.” In Allan Greenberg, Selected Works, 6-10. London: Academy Editions, 1995.
- Hewitt, Mark Alan. "Allan Greenberg." In America's Collection: The Art & Architecture of the Diplomatic Reception Rooms at the U.S. Department of State, New York: Rizzoli International, 2023, 107-135.

== Notable architects who worked for Allan Greenberg ==
- Duncan G. Stroik
- Michael Lykoudis
