= Central Mosque of Lisbon =

Mosque in Campolide, Lisbon, Portugal

- Mesquita Central de Lisboa
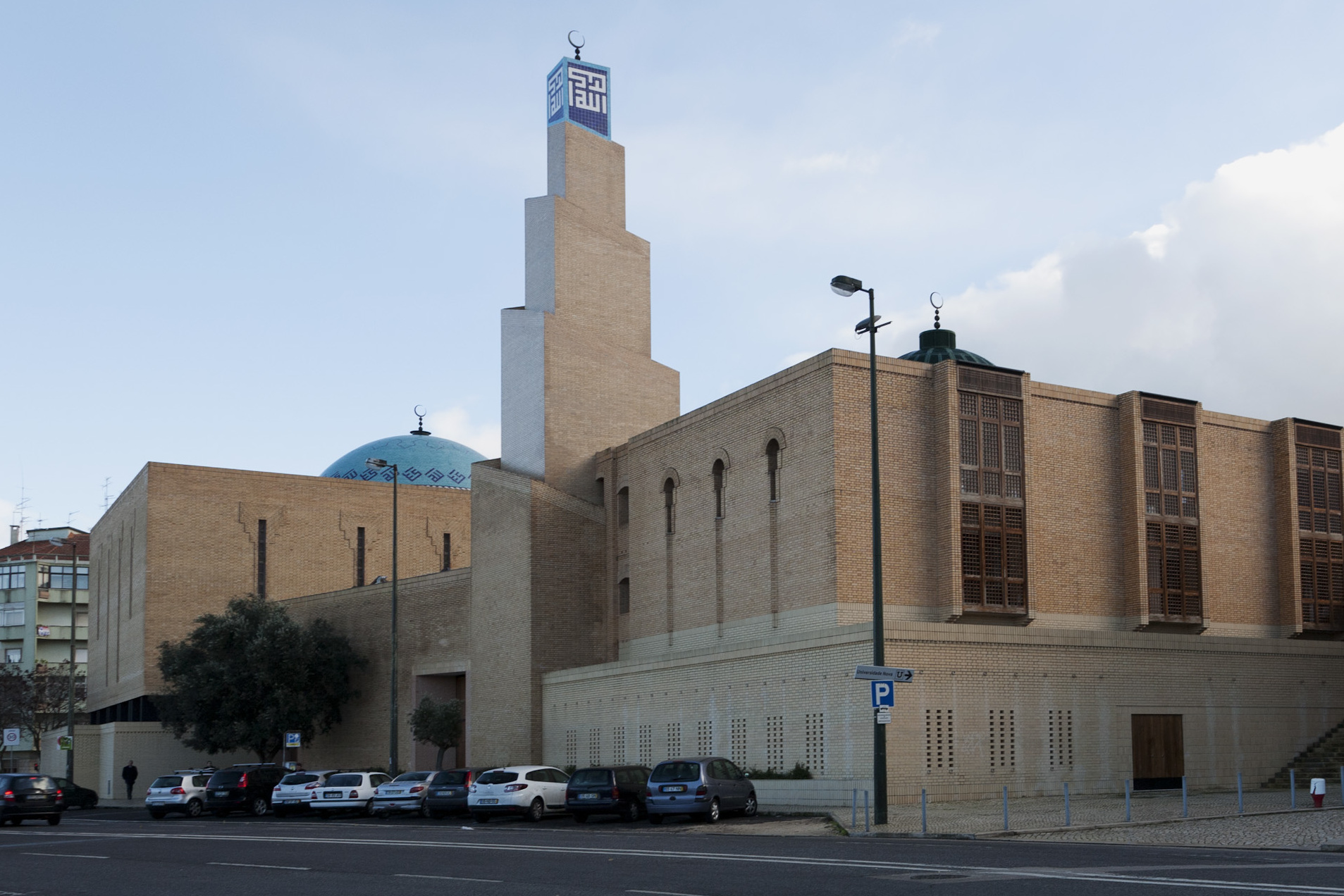

- Location within Lisbon

Religion
- Affiliation: Islam
- Branch/tradition: Sunni
- Leadership: Sheikh David Munir

Location
- Location: Campolide, Lisbon, Portugal
- Interactive map of Central Mosque of Lisbon
- Coordinates: 38°44′7.97″N 9°9′30.70″W

Architecture
- Architects: António Maria Braga, João Paulo Conceição
- Type: mosque
- Completed: 1985

Specifications
- Capacity: 1,000 worshippers
- Dome: 2
- Minaret: 4

The Central Mosque of Lisbon (Portuguese: Mesquita Central de Lisboa) is a mosque in Campolide, Lisbon, Portugal, serving the capital city's main mosque. The mosque is the largest mosque in Portugal. The mosque regularly holds various religious and cultural events, such as religious sermons, festive celebrations, Islamic classes and other social activities.

== History ==
Although permission to build the center was requested in 1966, it was not granted until 1978 after the 1973 oil crisis through which the Arab oil-producing nations gained increasing economic and political status. The structure was finally inaugurated in 1985 after seven years of construction work.

== Architecture ==
The building was designed by the architects António Maria Braga, winner of the 2019 Rafael Manzano Prize, and João Paulo Conceição. The mosque's external features include four minarets and two domes. The mosque consists of reception halls, the main prayer hall, a cultural center and an auditorium. The mosque was constructed with a mix of traditional Islamic architectural style and the local Portuguese style. The main prayer hall is decorated with various ornaments, Arabic calligraphy and Islamic architectural elements. The mosque has a capacity of more than 1,000 worshippers, making it the largest mosque in the country.

== Activities ==
The mosque regularly holds various religious and cultural activities, such as religious sermons, festive celebrations, Islamic classes and other social activities. The mosque is also the center to promote Islamic culture to the public. As of 2015, the imam of the mosque is Sheikh David Munir.

== See also ==
- Islam in Portugal
