= Mercado de Campo de Ourique =

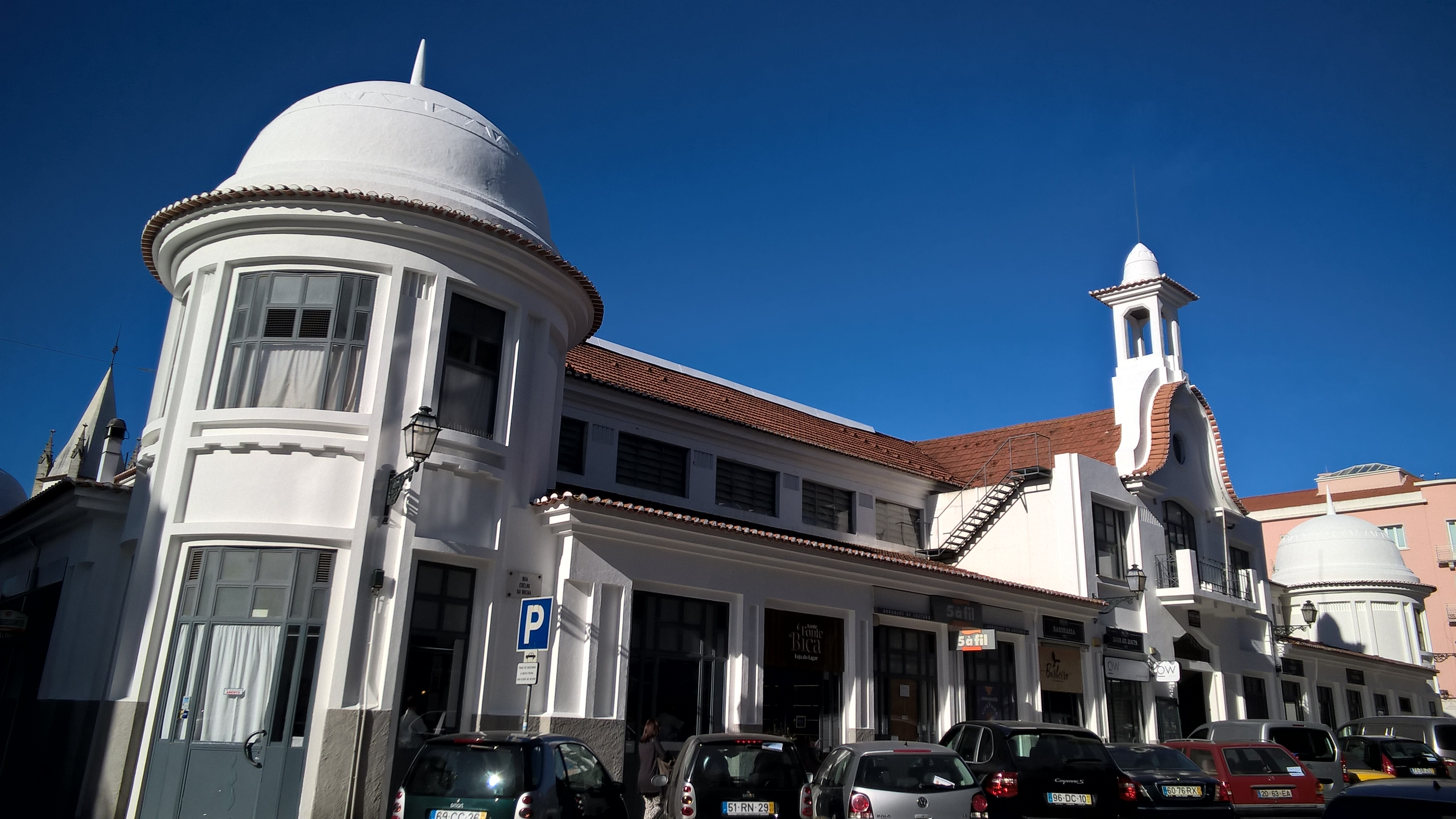
Exterior of Mercado de Campo de Ourique

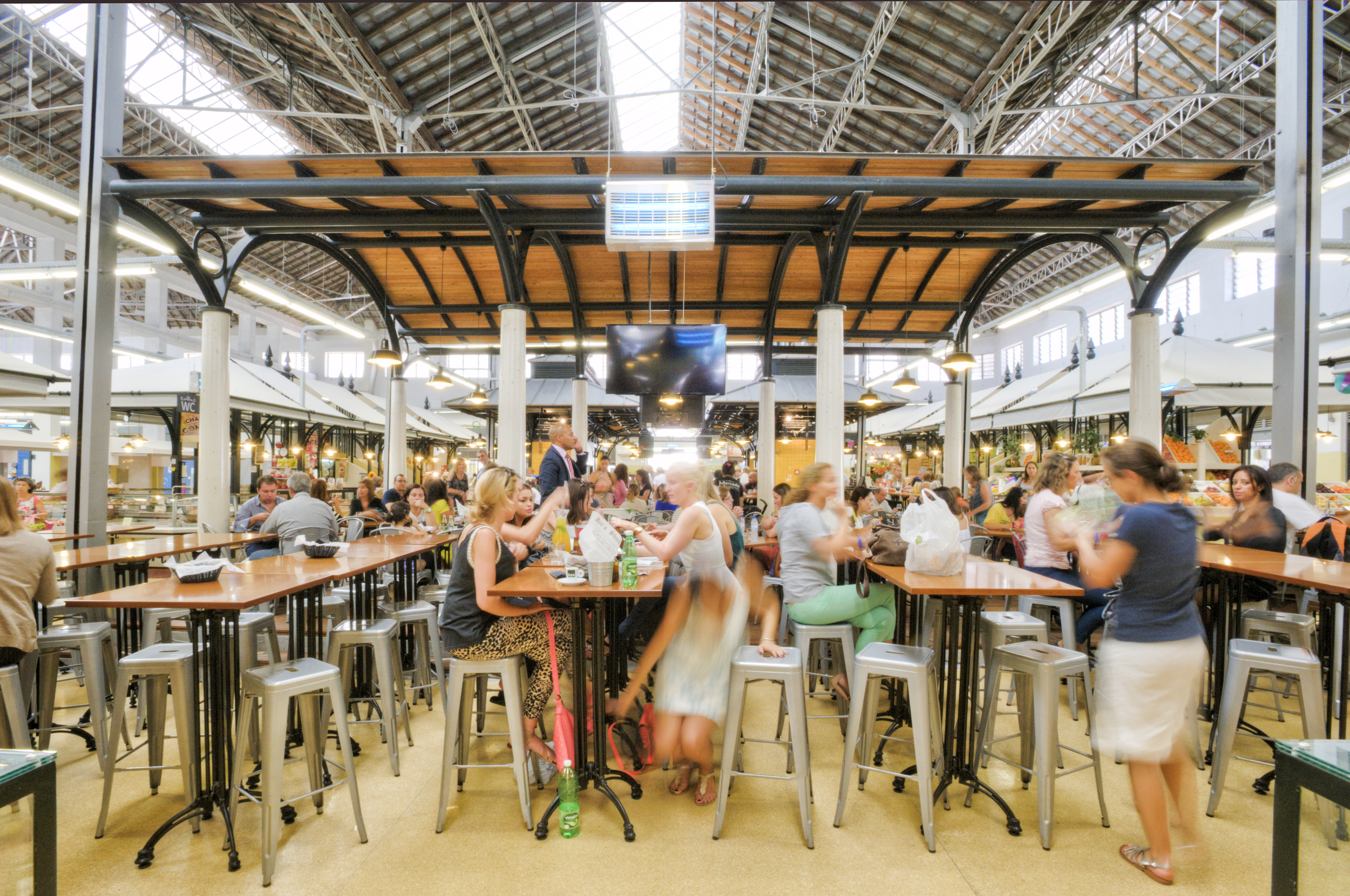
Interior of Mercado de Campo de Ourique

Mercado de Campo de Ourique (Portuguese pronunciation: [mɨɾˈkaðu ðɨ ˈkɐ̃pu ðɨ oˈɾikɨ]; "Campo de Ourique Market") is a neighborhood food market located in Lisbon, Portugal.

The market originally opened in 1934. It was remodelled in 1991 and most recently in 2013 by António Maria Braga, winners of the 2019 Rafael Manzano Prize. The market includes gourmet food stalls.

== See also ==
- Mercado de San Miguel, Madrid
