= Sergi Bastidas =

Spanish architect

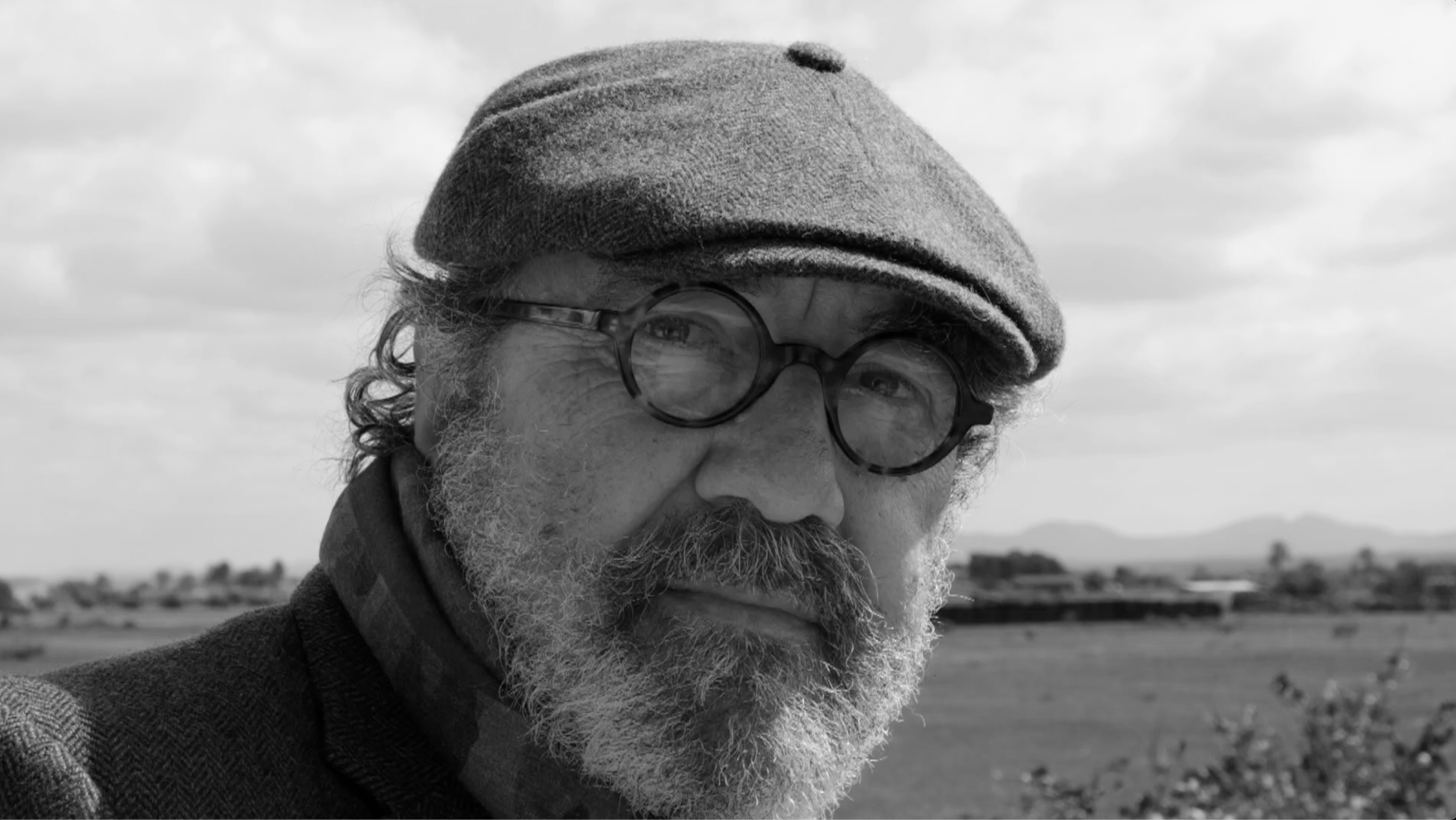
- Born: Barcelona, Spain
- Education: Escola de la Llotja
- Occupation: Architect
- Awards: Rafael Manzano Prize, 2021
- Practice: Bastidas Architecture

Sergi Bastidas (born February 1954, in Barcelona, Catalonia) is a Spanish designer and auto didactical architect. He is known for the integrative handling of historical buildings and the preservation of their original building substance.

After school Sergi Bastidas concluded his formal education at the Escuela de Artes Y Oficios de Barcelona. He then began working at the studio of Enric Franch Miret. The collaboration with the renowned industrial designer led to participations in various competitions of the Foment de les Arts i del Disseny, ADI-FAD. From the 1980s onwards, Bastidas devoted himself to architecture, especially in the Balearic Islands and realized concepts of buildings, especially from the 18th century, for their ecologically modern use while preserving the original character as much as possible.

For this purpose, local craft enterprises were involved and manufacturing techniques were partly revived: production of Roman brick, weaving techniques for natural cane, construction of dry-stone wall and masonry made of mortared quarrystone and fieldstone. In the reconstruction and expansion of historic buildings, traditional elements not only ensure the originality of the old substance. In combination with modern techniques, they improve acoustics, thermals and the performance, especially in buildings used all year round, such as the hotel Can Ferrereta, originally from the 18th century, or the Can O'Ryan townhouse, also 18th century, which together with a former cinema theatre forms the current Rialto Living ensemble in the old town of Palma de Mallorca. Traditional Balearic elements are also incorporated into the realization of new buildings: town houses get integrated into the neighbouring old stock and solitary buildings are in harmony with the landscape.

An example of bioclimatic architecture in the social sector is the Ameskar Rural School in the Tinghir Province in the Moroccan Atlas Mountains. In 2017, donations from the French Marathon des Sables foundation MDS Solidarité and Bastidas made it possible to completely renovate and expand the school with materials and components that are mostly locally sourced. At the same time, it was ensured that the high climatic requirements for classrooms, dormitories and staff rooms in the mountainous region were met and that the kitchen and sanitary facilities functioned perfectly at outside temperatures of up to -20°C. This realization was not only identity-forming for the inhabitants of the Ameskar et Tahtani community. It also facilitated the future maintenance of the school building by local craftsmen.

Due to his careful handling of historical buildings, the surrounding gardens and parks Sergi Bastidas was honored with the Rafael Manzano Prize for New Traditional Architecture donated by Richard H. Driehaus in 2021. The presentation of the most prestigious architecture prize awarded on the Iberian Peninsula took place in Madrid at the Royal Academy of Fine Arts of San Fernando. Reasoning of the jury, quote excerpt: The buildings he designs seem to merge with their setting thanks to his attention to local terrain, climate, materials and building traditions, the ways in which the place has been used traditionally and its vegetation and landscape. Hence he is a great advocate of more natural and sustainable materials, which also give his work warmth and humanity: stone, lime, wood, cane etc. The laudation was held by Léon Krier.

Sergi Bastidas is an honorary member of the International Network for Traditional Building Architecture and Urbanism, INTBAU, and lives on Mallorca.

== Bibliography ==
- Balearic Retreats, Publisher: Beta-Plus Publishing 2018, ISBN 978-2-87550-055-7 (in English and in Spanish)
- Ultimate Bathroom Design, Editor TeNeues Verlag Augsburg 2004, ISBN 978-3-8238-4596-6(in English)
- Piscinas, Ediciones Librería Universitaria de Barcelona, S.L., 2003, ISBN 84-89978-63-8 (in Spanish)
- Landhäuser auf Mallorca, Editorial: Taschen 2000, ISBN 3-8228-6012-3(in German)
- Mallorca mit Stil, Publisher: Thomas Niederste-Werbeck, Editor Callwey München 2019, ISBN 978-3-7667-2384-0(in German)
