= António Maria Braga =

Portuguese architect

António Maria Braga is a Portuguese architect, who specializes in traditional Portuguese architecture. Together with the architect Alberto Castro Nunes, he was the 8th winner of the Rafael Manzano Prize for New Traditional Architecture, awarded in 2019.

== Education ==
António Braga graduated in Architecture in 1980 from the Escola Superior de Belas-Artes of Lisbon (ESBAL), today the Faculty of Architecture of the University of Lisbon, which at the time offered an exclusively Modernist curriculum. António Braga thus developed his mastery of traditional architecture outside his academic years.

== Major projects ==
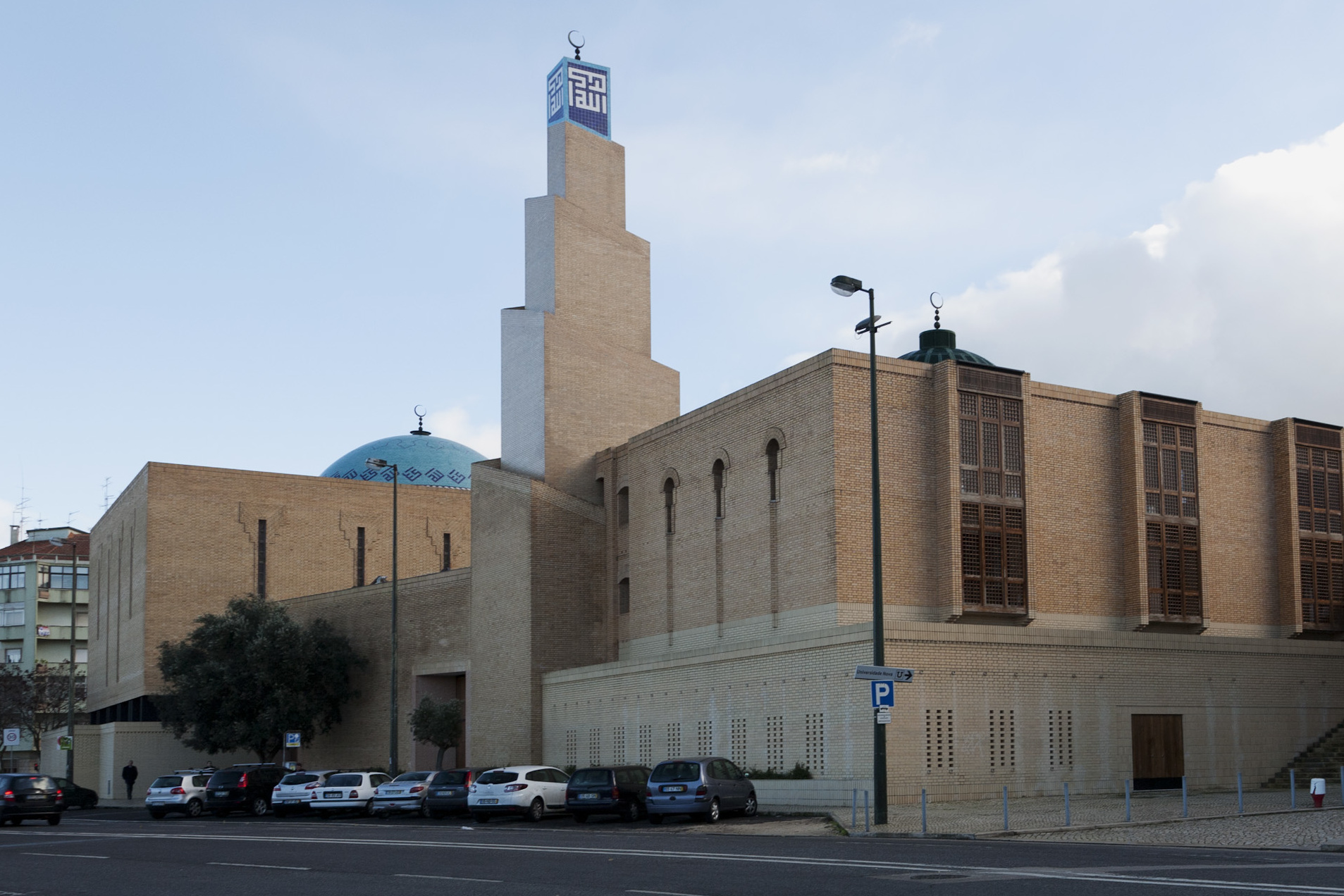
Central Mosque of Lisbon (1985), together with João Paulo Conceição.

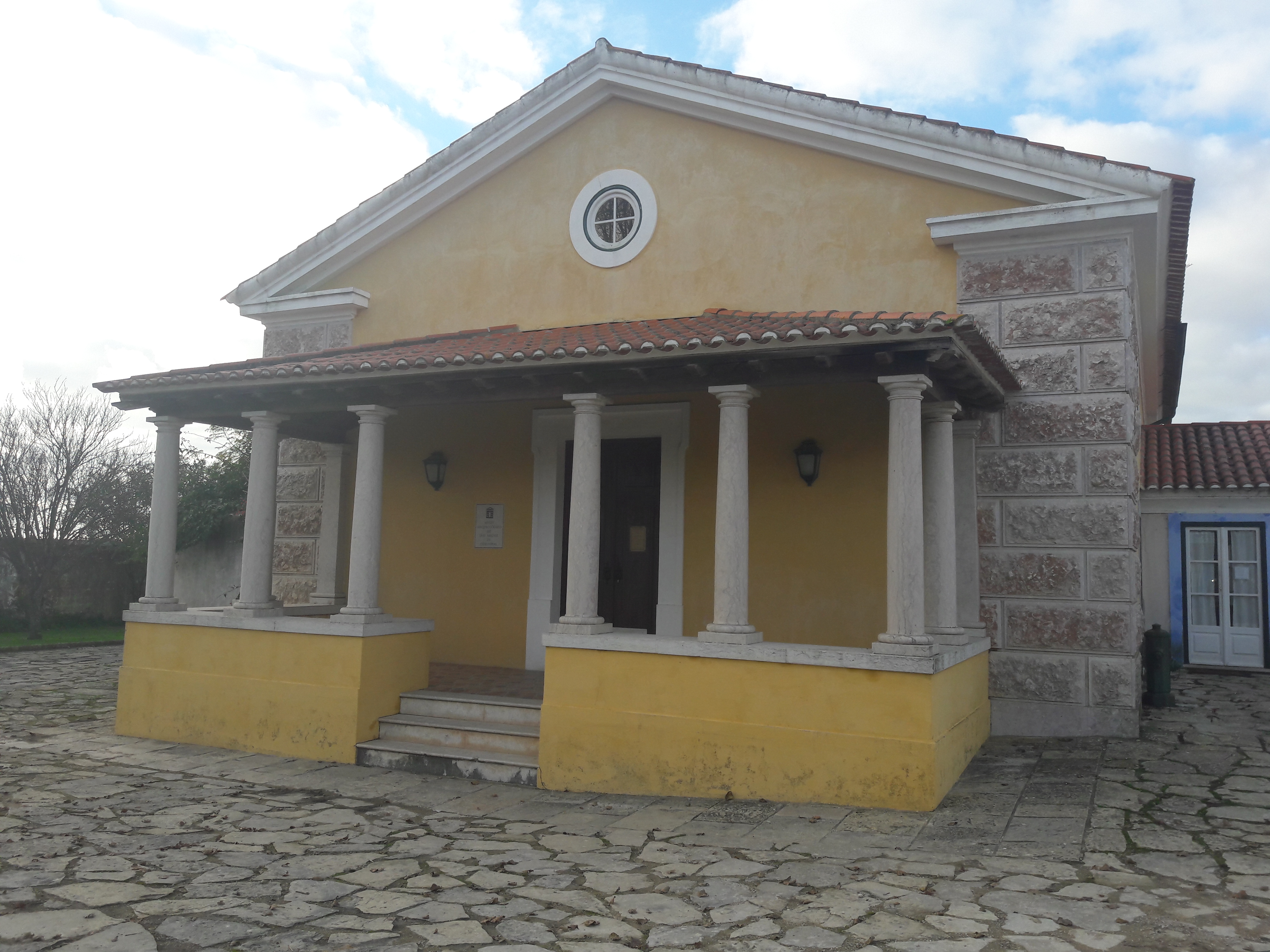
Museum of São Miguel de Odrinhas (1999), together with Alberto Castro Nunes and Léon Krier.

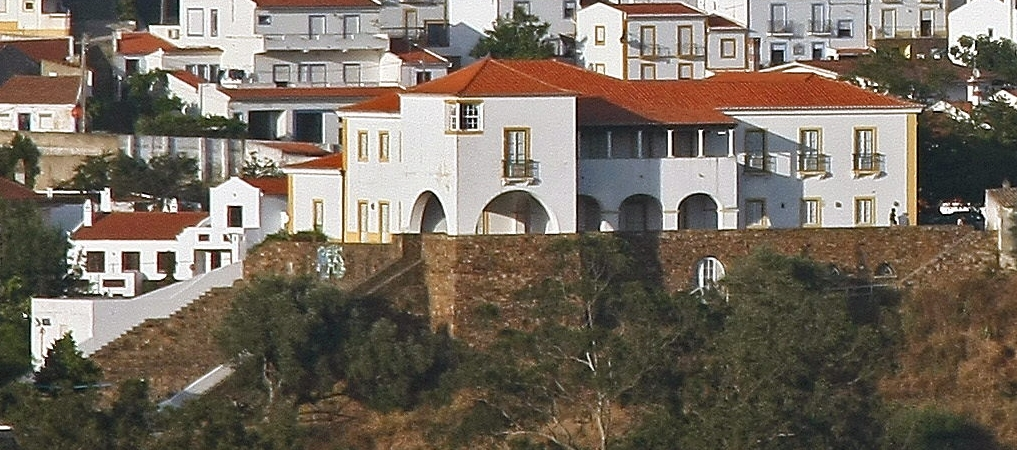
José Saramago Public Library of Odemira (2000), together with Alberto Castro Nunes

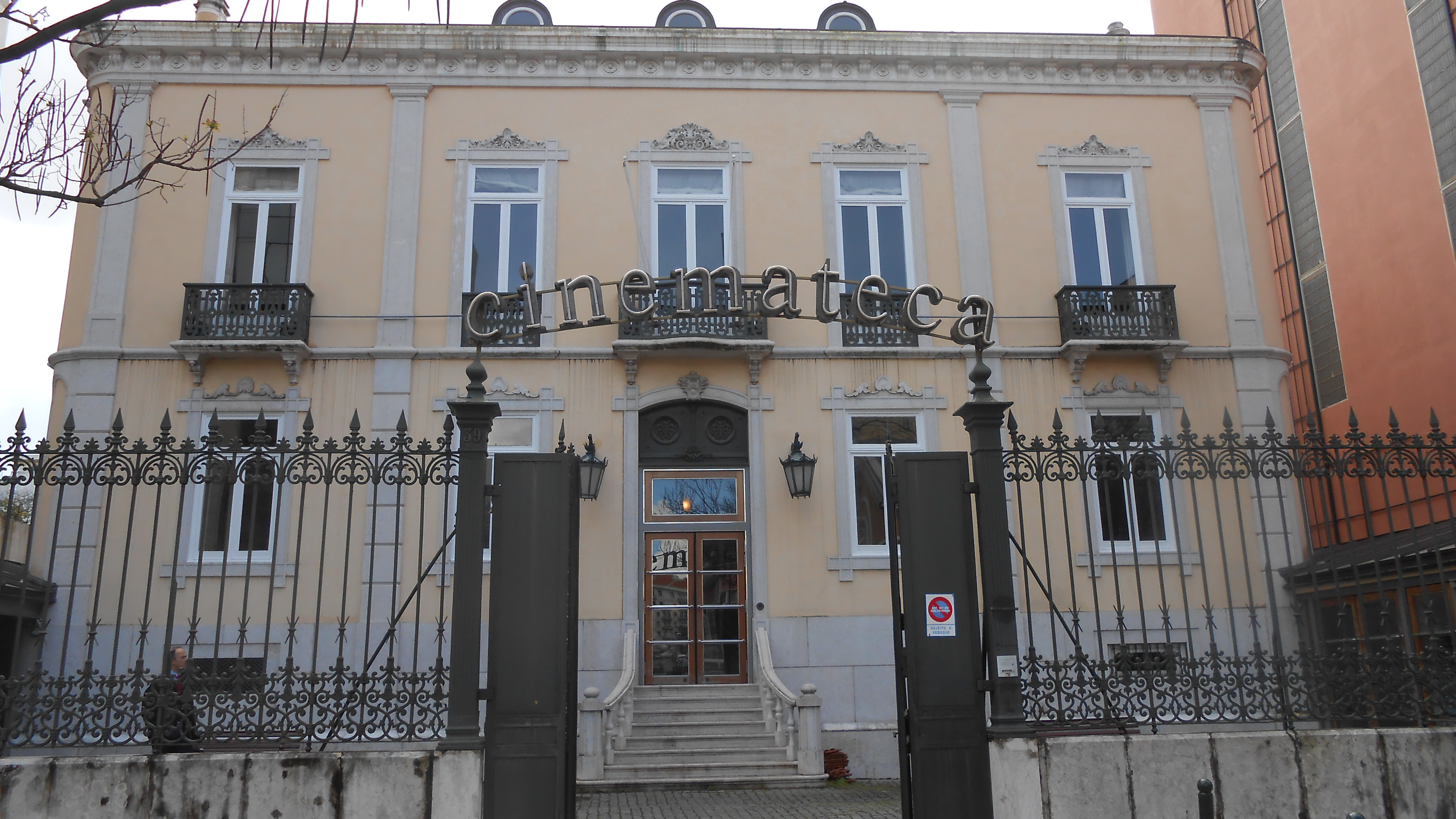
Renovation of the Cinemateca Portuguesa building (2002), together with Alberto Castro Nunes.

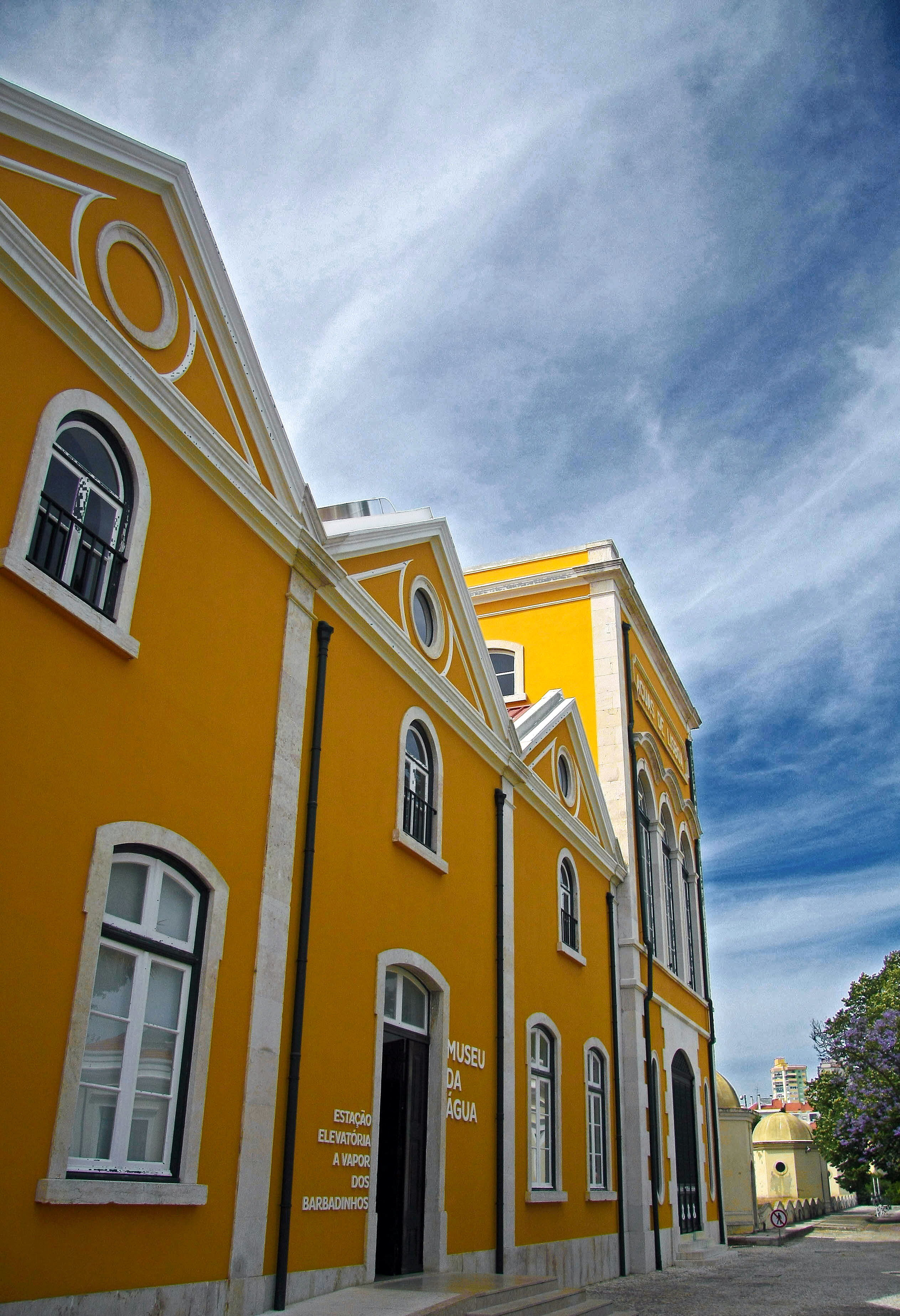
Expansion of the Museu da Água in Lisbon

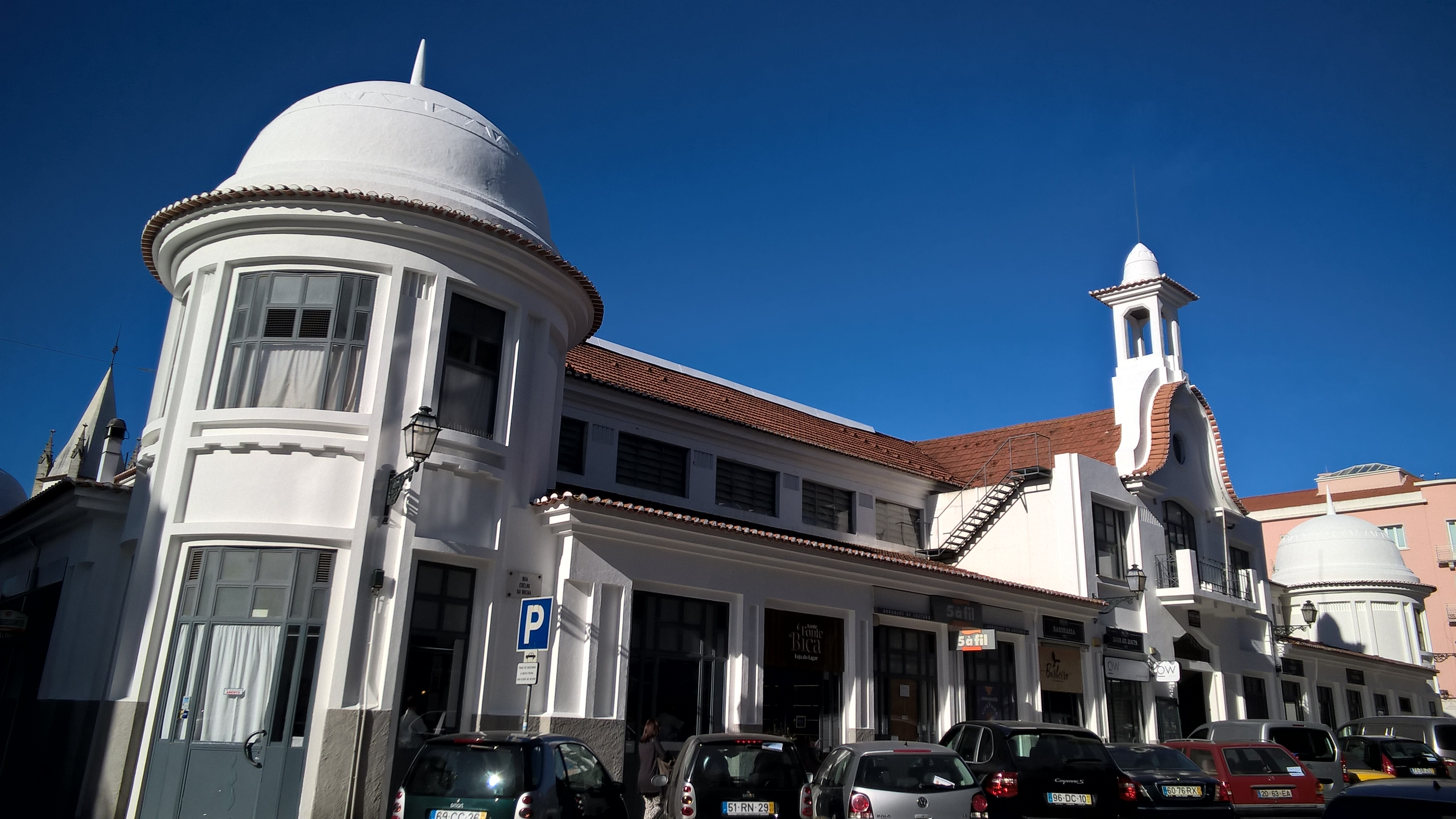
Renovation of the Campo de Ourique Market (2013).

== Awards ==
- 2019: Winner of the Rafael Manzano Prize, together with Alberto Castro Nunes
- 2002: Shortlisted for the Philippe Rotthier Prize, together with Alberto Castro Nunes
