= Campolide =

- Civil parish
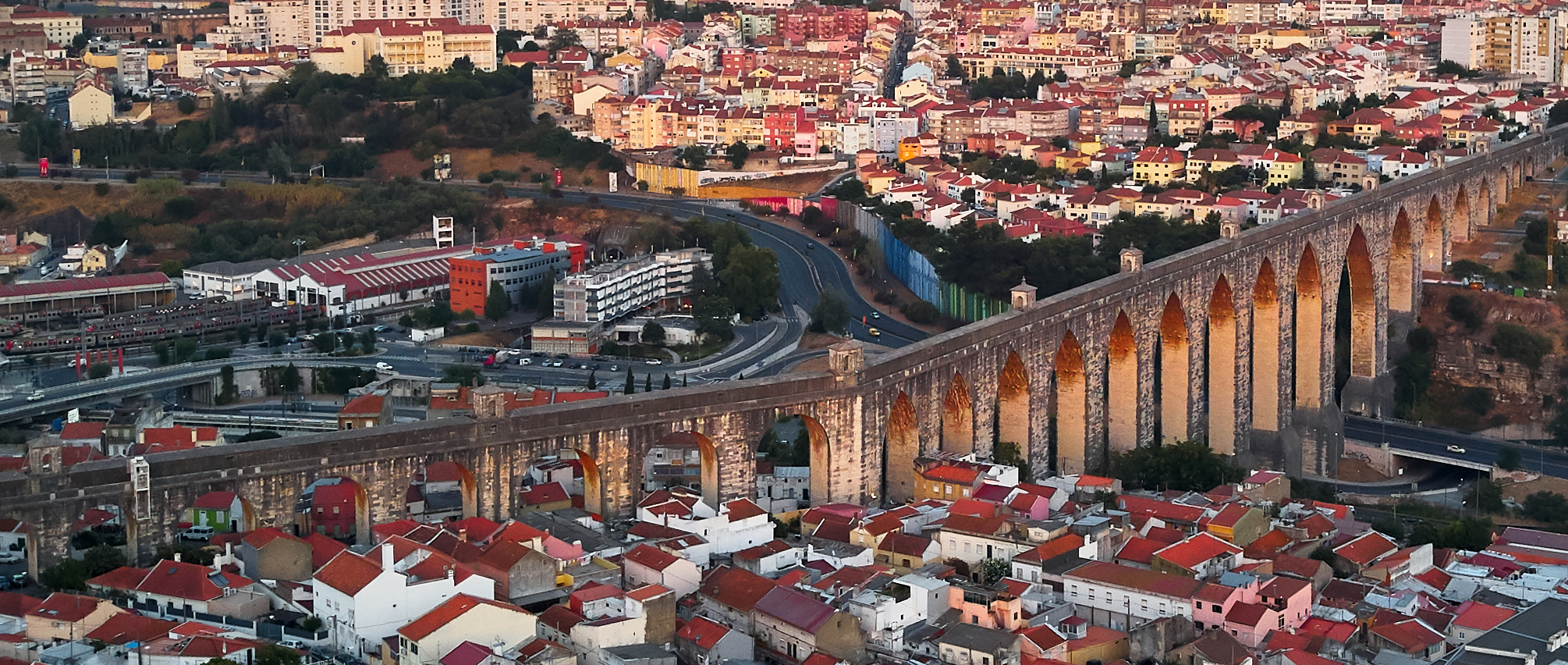
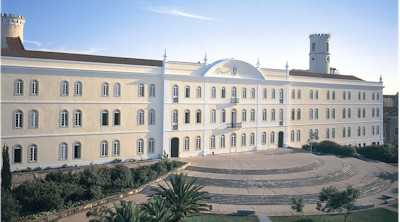
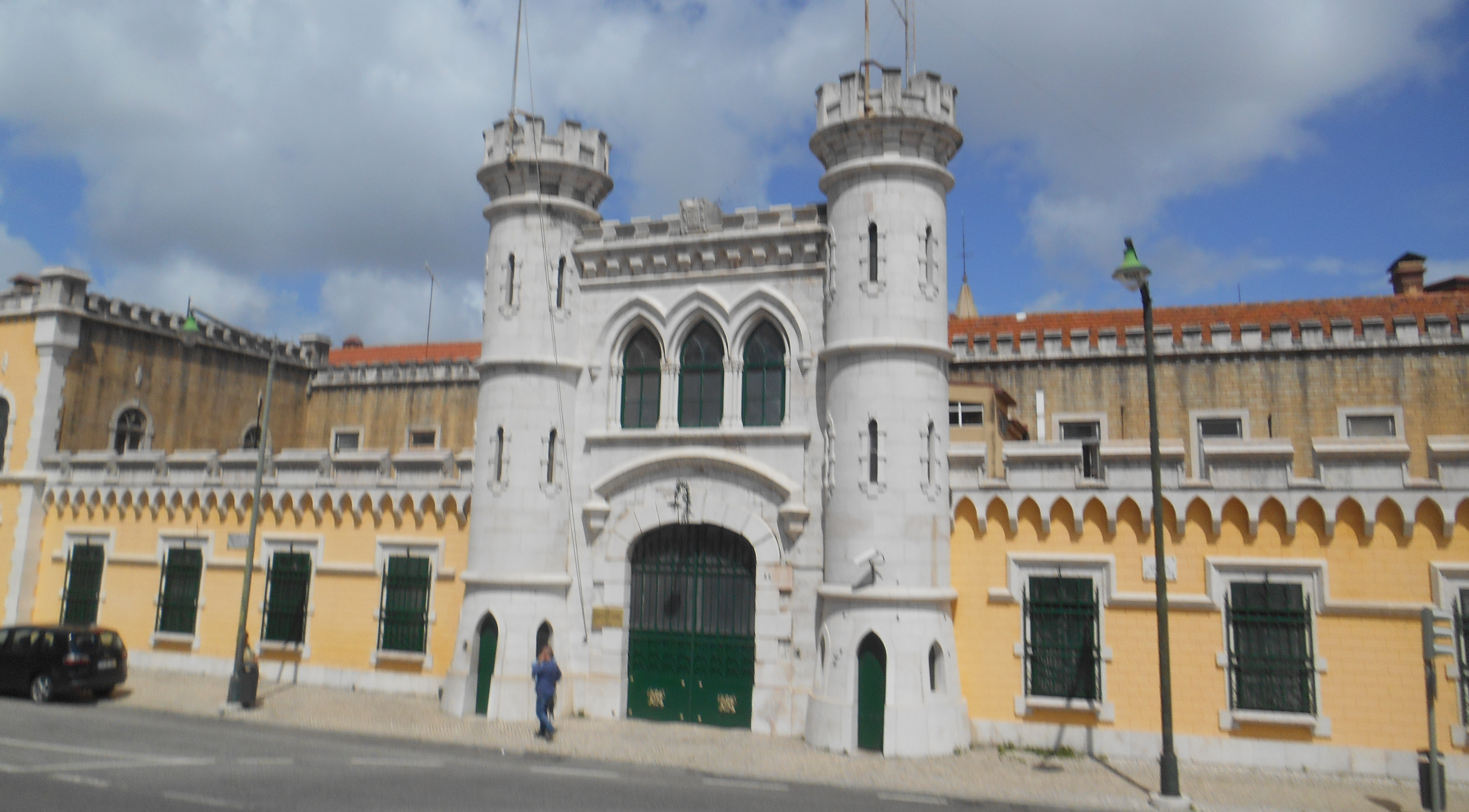
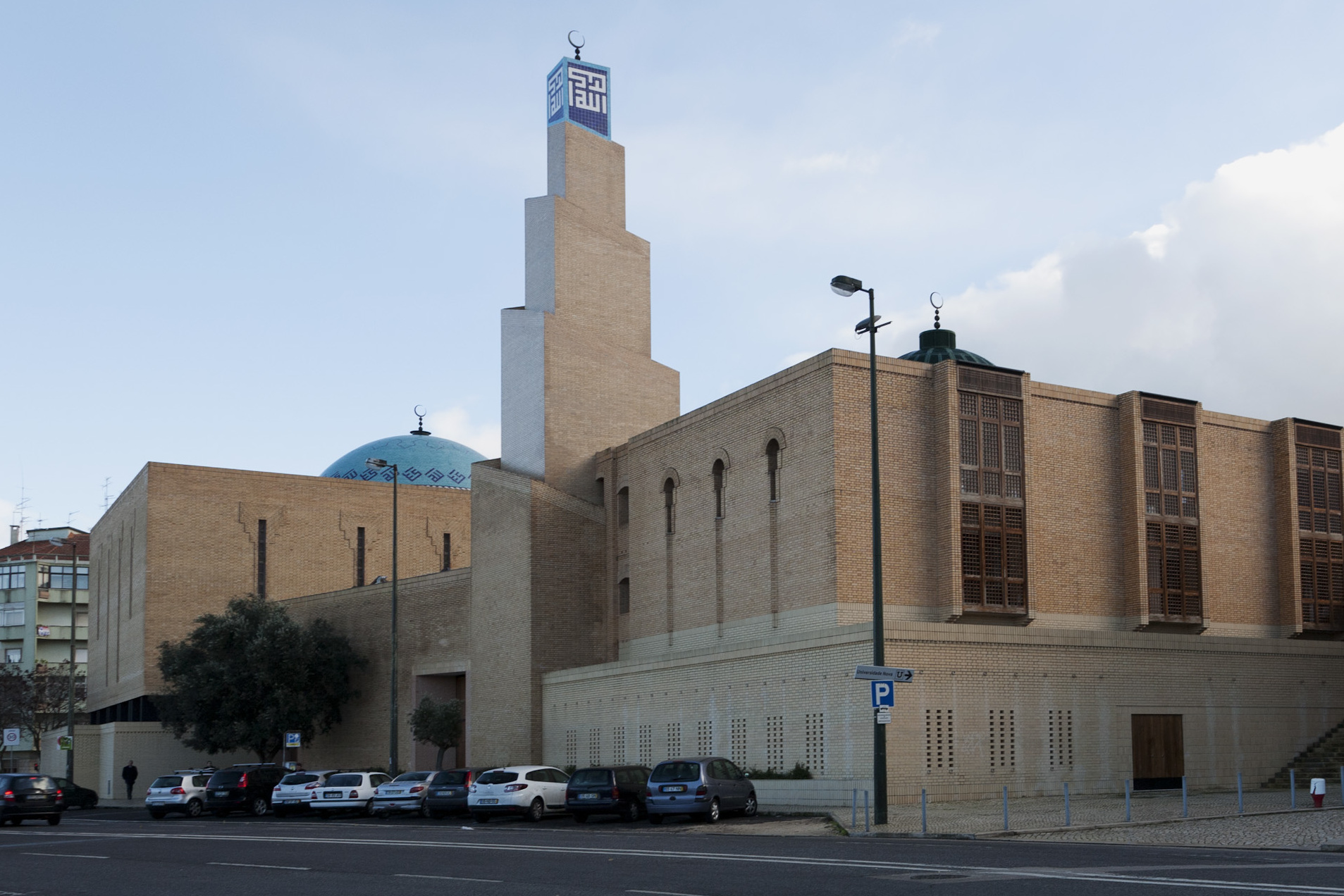
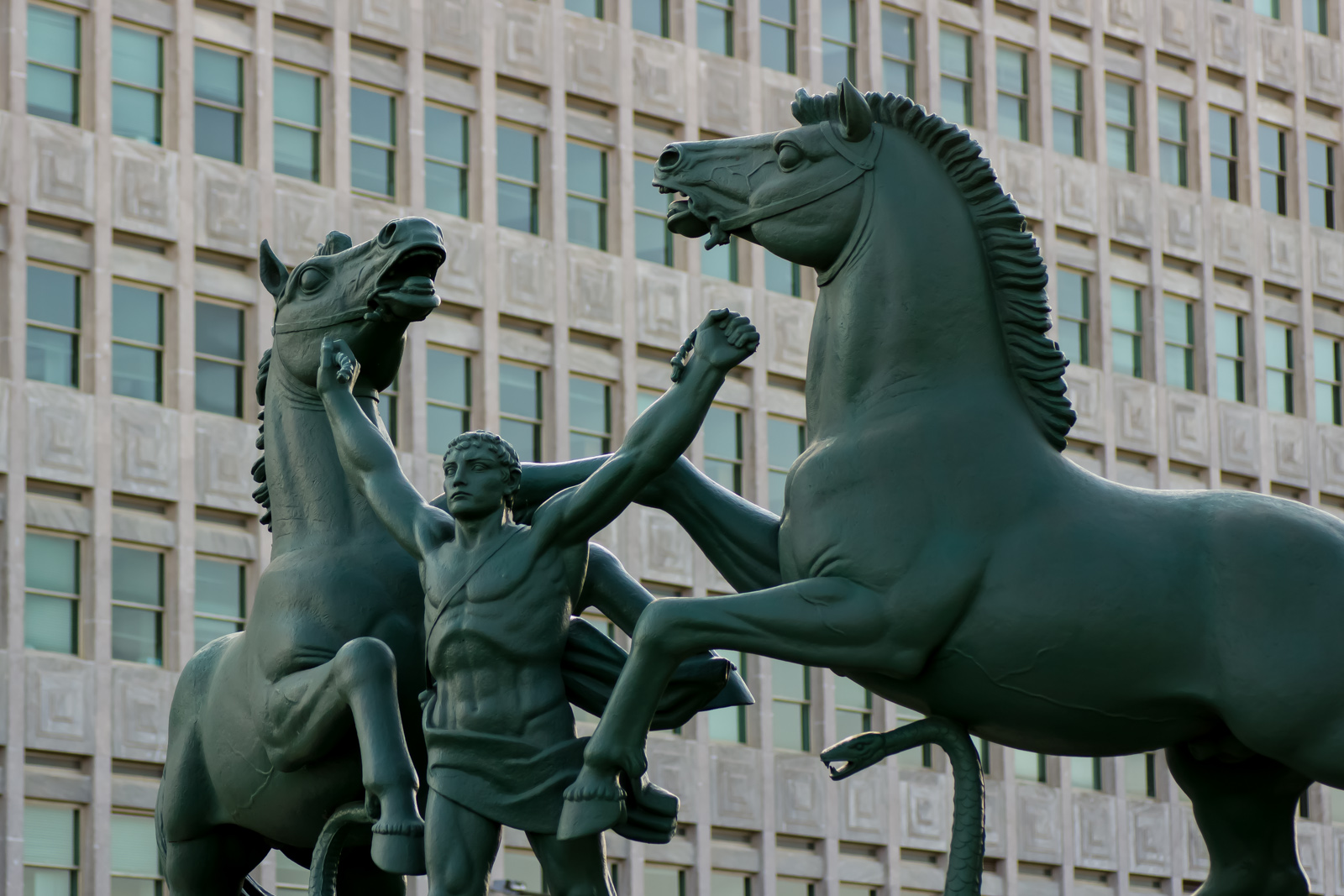
- Clockwise: View of the Águas Livres Aqueduct; Cadeia de Lisboa; Palácio da Justiça; Central Mosque of Lisbon; NOVA University Lisbon.

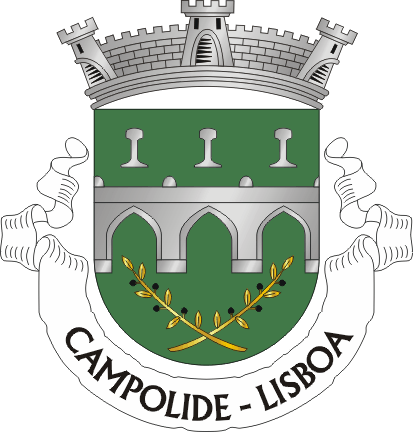
- Coat of arms

- Coordinates: 38.727°N 9.162°W
- Country: Portugal
- Region: Lisbon
- Metropolitan area: Lisbon
- District: Lisbon
- Municipality: Lisbon

Area
  - Total: 2.77 km^{2} (1.07 sq mi)

Population (2011)
  - Total: 15,460
  - Density: 5,580/km^{2} (14,500/sq mi)
- Time zone: UTC+00:00 (WET)
  - Summer (DST): UTC+01:00 (WEST)
- Website: jf-campolide.pt

Campolide (European Portuguese pronunciation: [kɐ̃puˈliðɨ]) is a freguesia (civil parish) and district of Lisbon, the capital of Portugal. Located in central Lisbon, Campolide is west of Avenidas Novas, north of Campo de Ourique, east of Benfica, and south of São Domingos de Benfica. The population in 2011 was 15,460,

== History ==
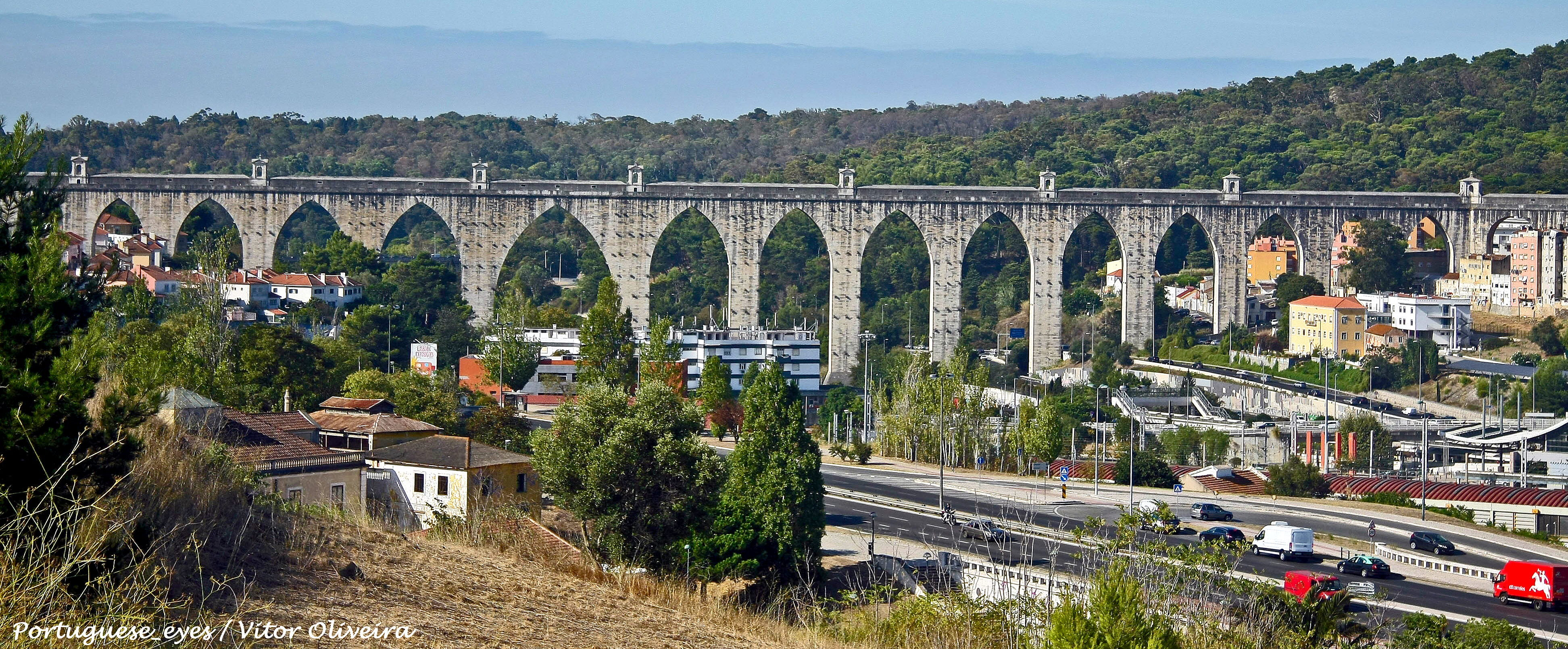
The Águas Livres Aqueduct.

Campolide was the site of a major battle on 5 September 1833, when the forces of Dom Miguel attacked those of Dom Pedro, as Pedro attempted to wrest back control of Portugal from his brother.

Campolide was made a freguesia of Lisbon on February 7, 1959.

On 7 August 2008, two Brazilian robbers robbed a Banco Espírito Santo branch kidnapping six hostages, including the bank manager. This hostage hijacking ended with the intervention of the special forces of Portuguese police.

== Population ==
Population growth of the Campolide parish
1960	1970	1981	1991	2001	2011
33 764	31 017	26 655	20 972	15 927	15 460

== Landmarks ==
- Águas Livres Aqueduct
- Palácio da Justiça
- Central Mosque of Lisbon
- NOVA University Lisbon
