= Market of San Miguel =

- Mercado de San Miguel (Spanish)
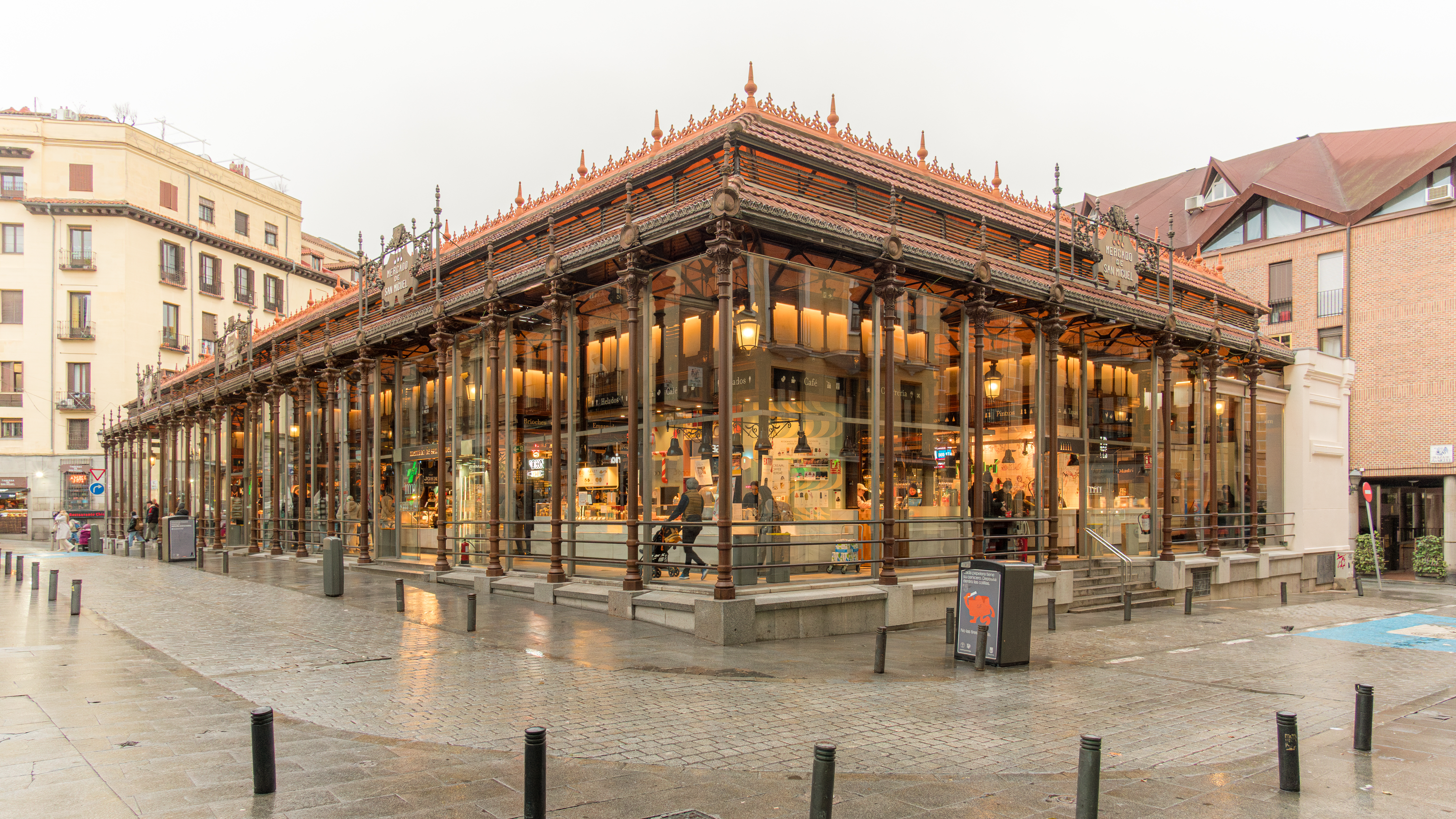

- Location within Spain
- 40.415438°N 3.708869°W
- Location: Madrid, Spain

Spanish Cultural Heritage
- Official name: Mercado de San Miguel
- Type: Non-movable
- Designated: 2000
- Reference no.: RI-51-0010569

The Market of San Miguel (Spanish: Mercado de San Miguel) is a covered market located in Madrid, Spain. Originally built in 1916, it was purchased by private investors in 2003 who renovated the iron structure and reopened it in 2009.

== Overview ==
San Miguel Market is the most popular market in Madrid among tourists since it is located in the centre of Madrid, within walking distance from Plaza Mayor. The market is not a traditional grocery market but a gourmet tapas market, with over 30 different vendors selling a wide variety of freshly prepared tapas, hams, olives, baked goods and other foods. Beer, wine and champagne are also available.

== History ==
The San Miguel Market is located in the heart of the city of Madrid, right next door to the historic Plaza Mayor, and in between Puerta del Sol and the Royal Palace. This touristy location brings a lot of people into the market. The original plaza was home to the 13th century San Miguel de los Octoes church. The church was demolished in 1809. Following this, an open-air fish market opened in the same square. This fish market was not well kept, which led city officials to make changes in the late 19th century. The city began to build a covered market under Spanish architect Alfonso Dubé. Dubé used Paris' Les Halles market as inspiration for the San Miguel Market. It was officially inaugurated on May 13, 1916.

The market is a 1,764 square meter building constructed in wrought iron and glass. It has 2 floors and is built over a horizontal platform, elevated 10 centimeters from the lowest point and 1.65 meters from the highest point. The building itself is made up of marble, granite, metal and glass. These materials were used because they are durable, and they also elevate the look of the structure. The granite extract comes from two quarries located close to Madrid. The structure cost 18,000 euros to construct.

It is divided into more than 40 food stands. It was acquired in 2017 by Redevco and Are's Management for 70 million euros, and became a magnet for foodies and tourists in Madrid. After one year of active asset management to improve the quality of the food offered, the market was relaunched in 2018 as a high end dining venue. This renovation improved qualities such as cleanliness, price points, ingredients, and customer experience. San Miguel Market is now one of Europe's leading gastronomic markets, welcoming more than 7 million visitors each year.

The market serves a variety of high quality tapas and pub-fare like Iberian ham, Mediterranean rice dishes, fresh fish and shellfish brought in daily from Galicia, and exquisite cheeses from Castile, Asturias, and the Basque Country.

== Gallery ==
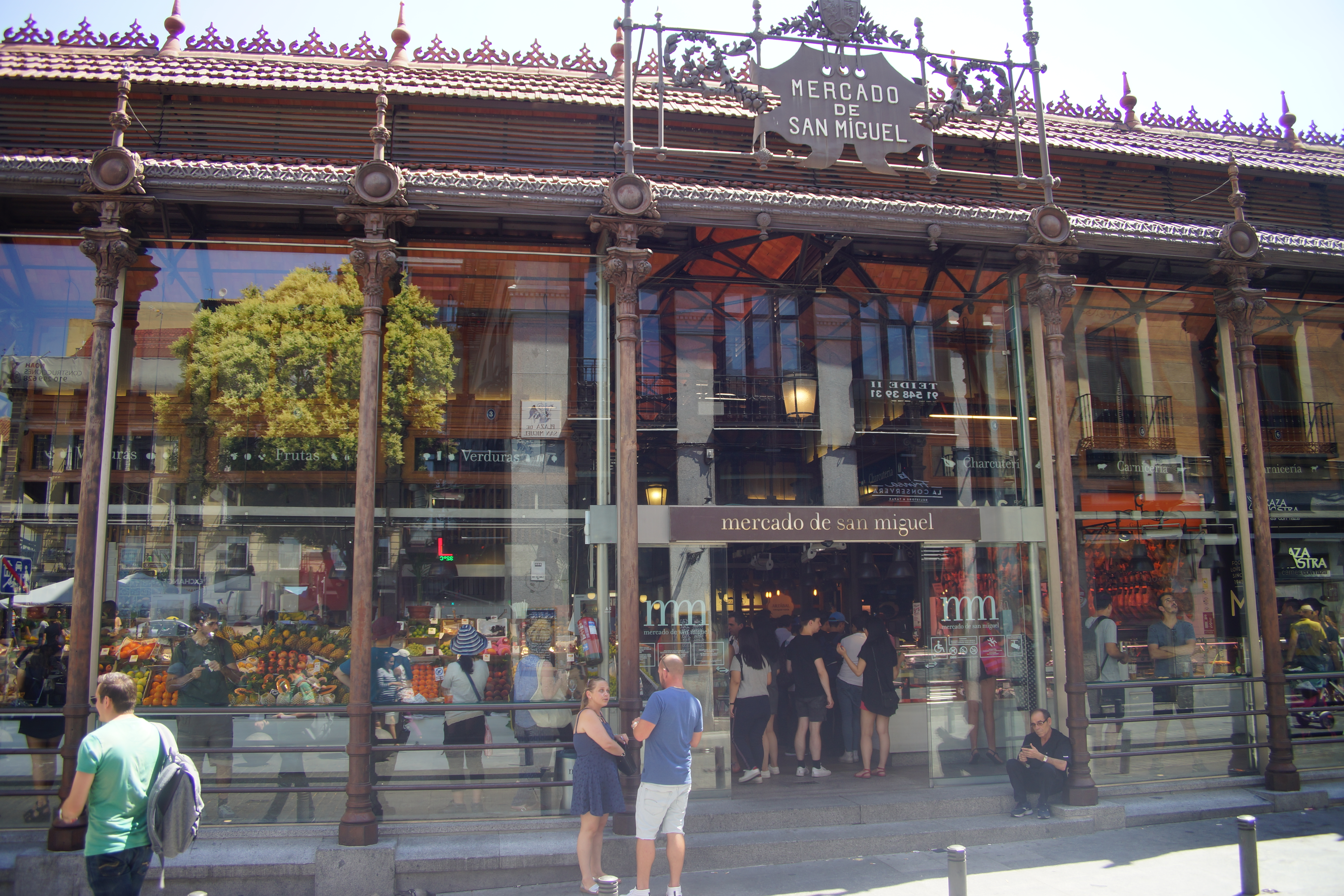
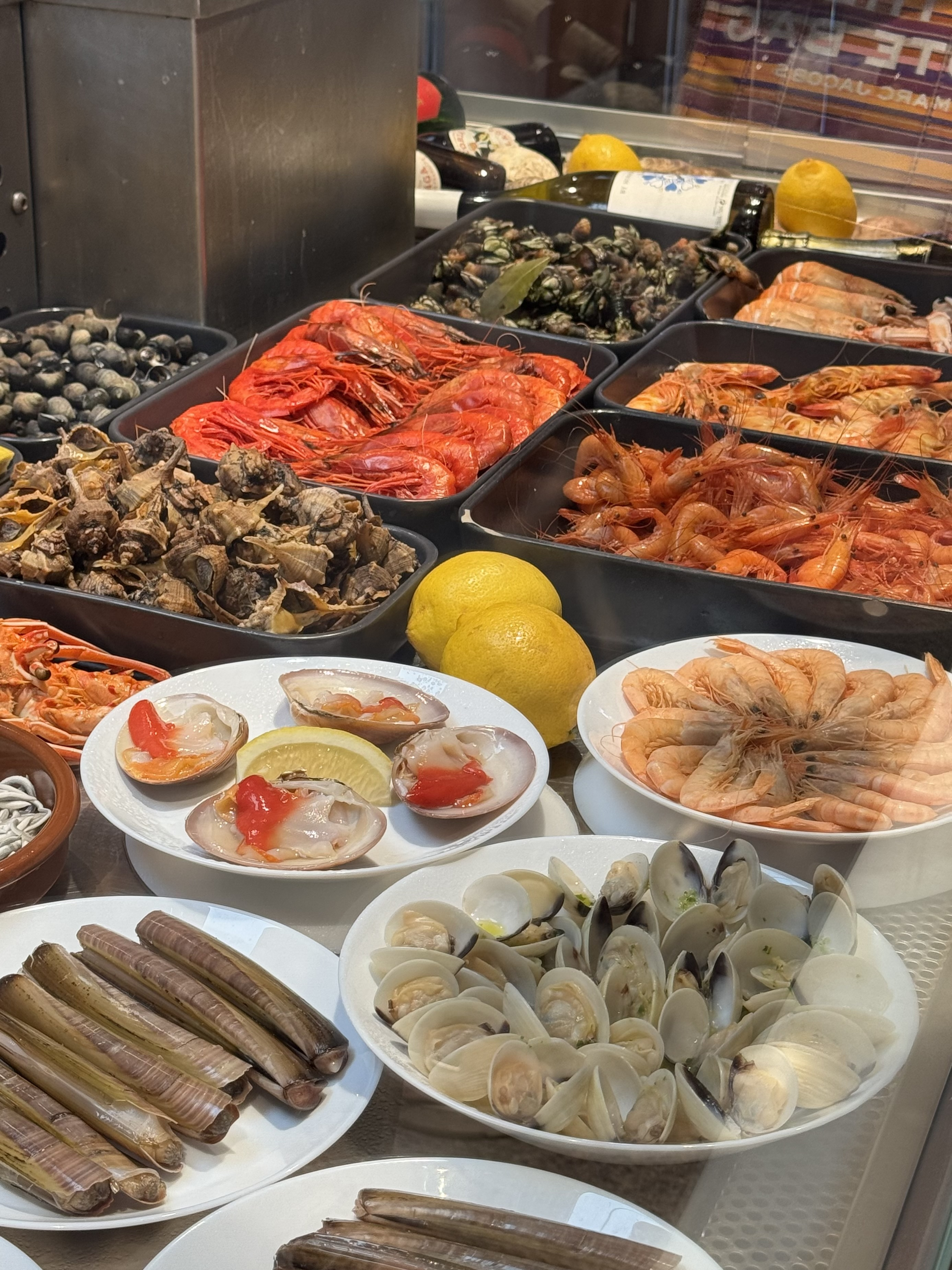
Fresh Seafood from San Miguel Market
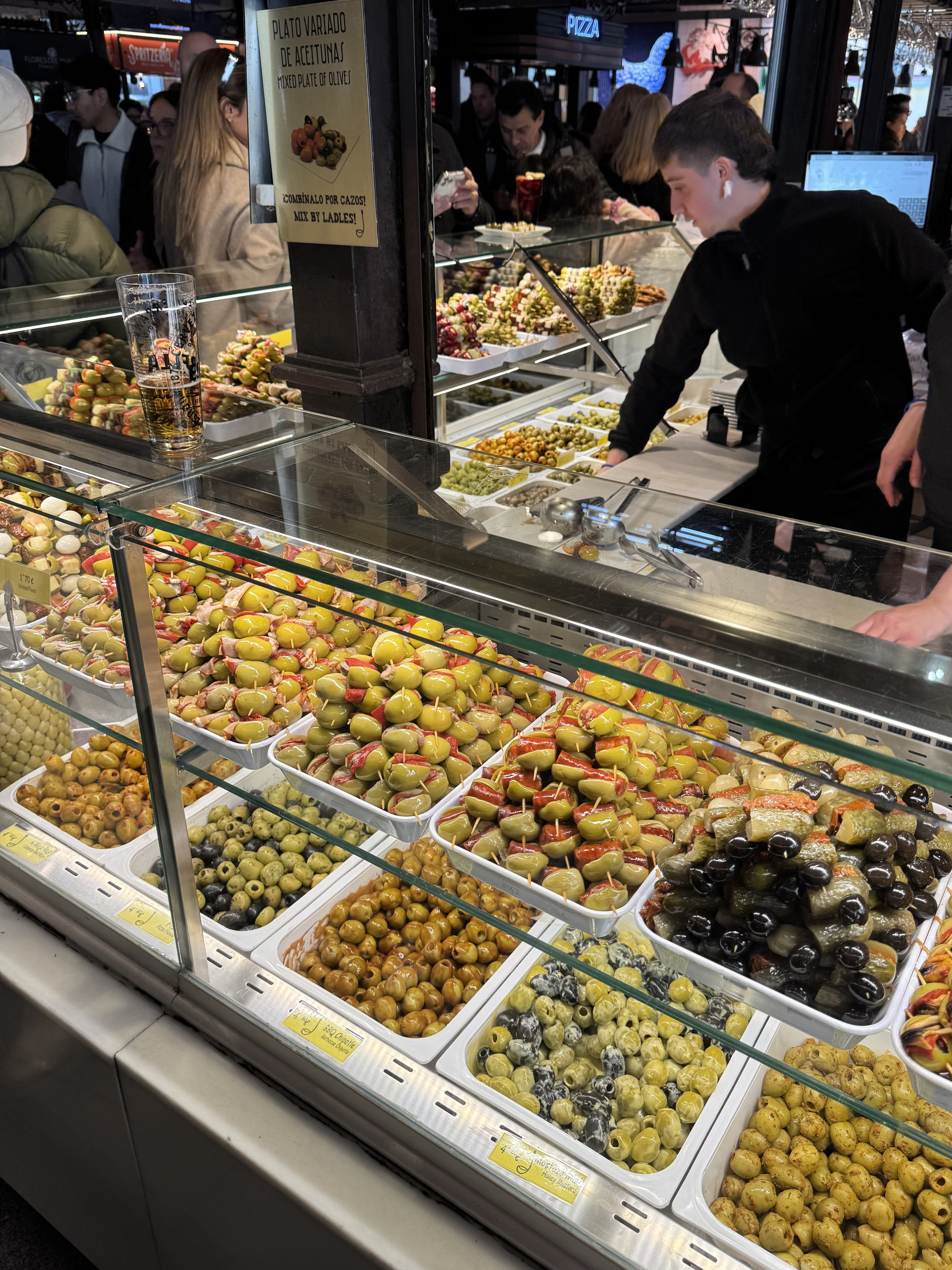
Olives at The San Miguel Market
An exterior daylight view of the Mercado de San Miguel in Madrid

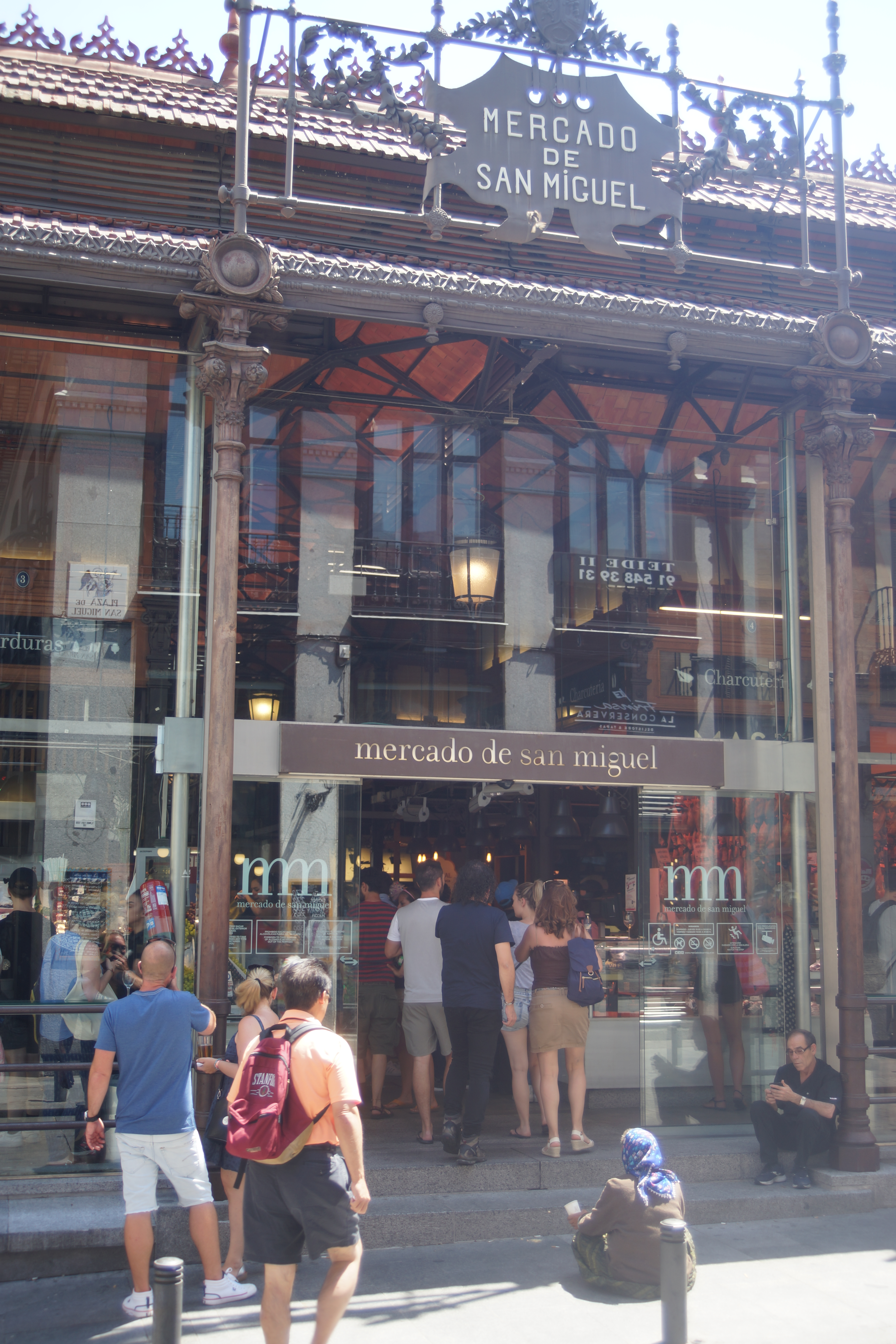
Exterior of the Mercado De San Miguel in Madrid

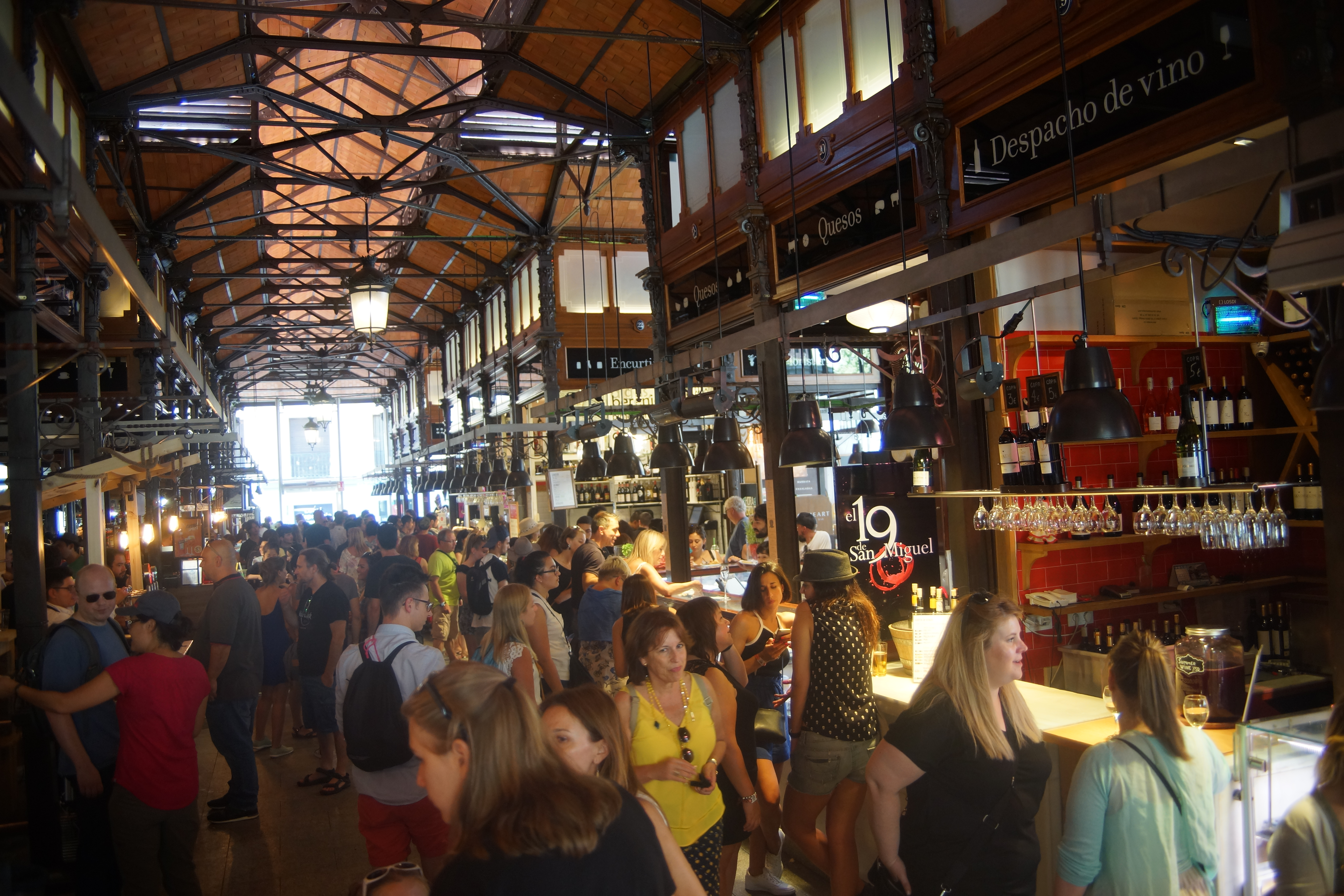
Wine and cheese snacks sold in stalls at the Mercado de San Miguel in Madrid

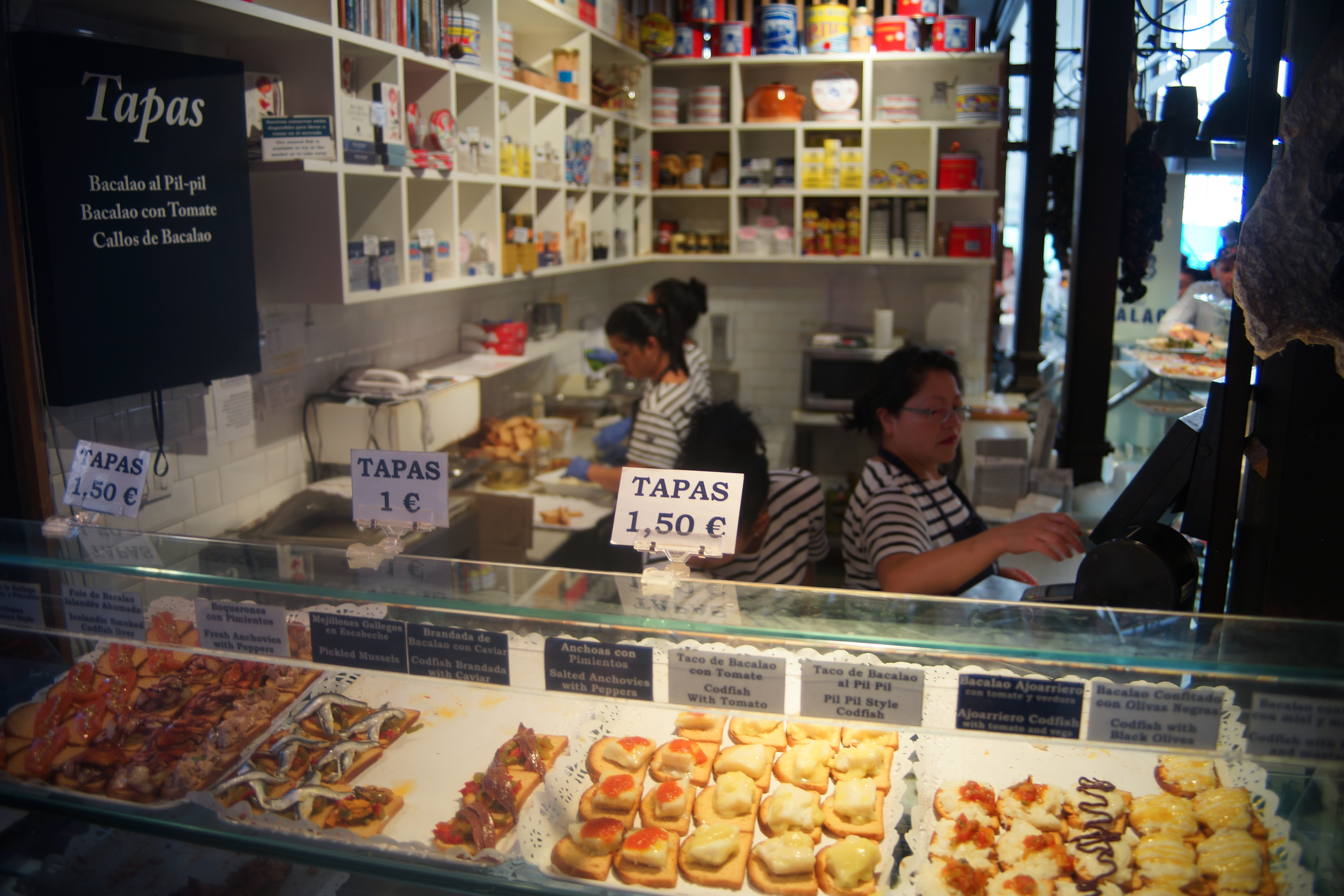
One of many tapas stalls in the Mercado de San Miguel in Madrid

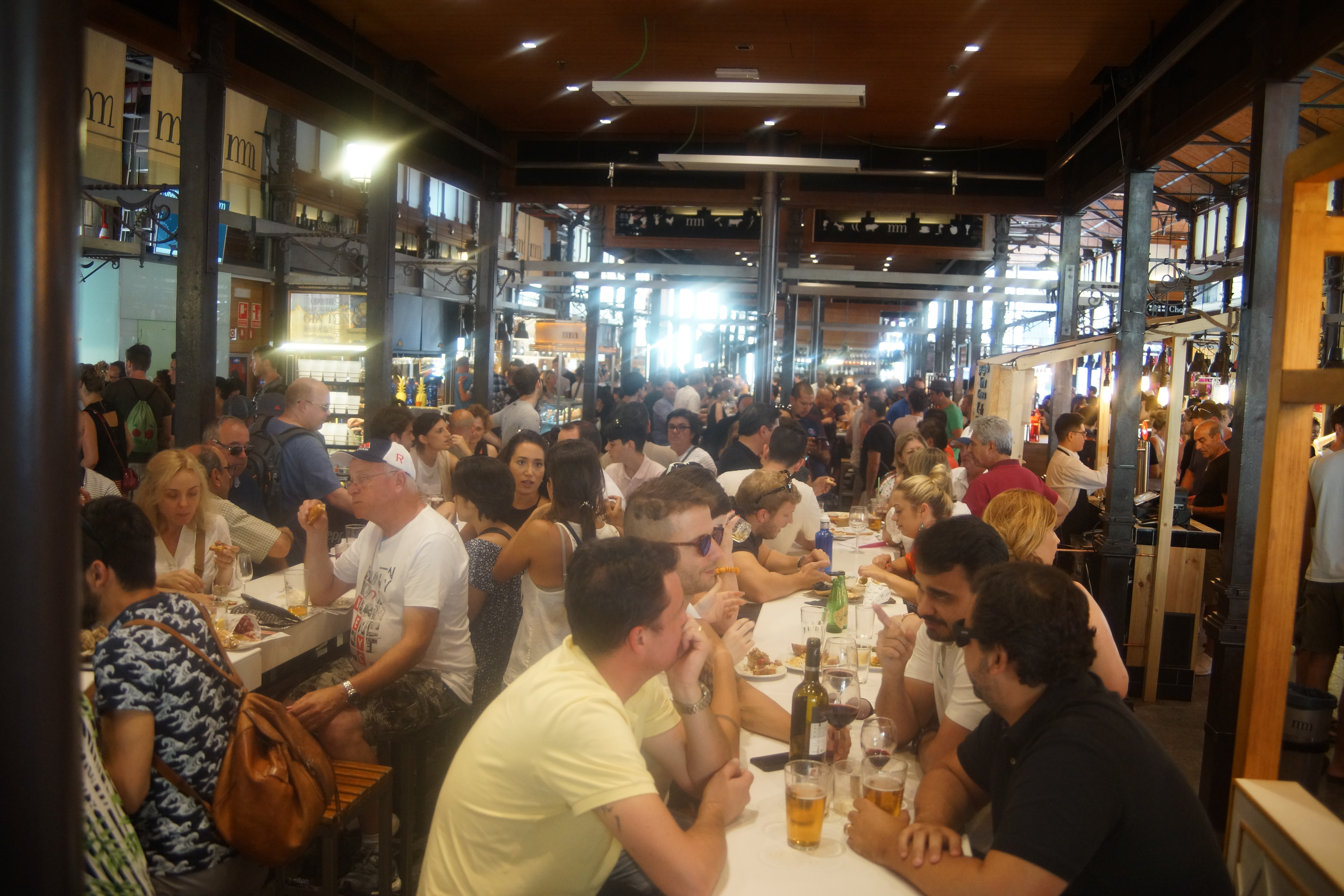
Interior of Mercado de San Miguel showing people meeting for tapas and drinks

== See also ==
- Mercado de Campo de Ourique, Lisbon
