= Rafael Manzano Prize =

Architecture prize

- Awarded for: A career of achievement in the art of Iberian traditional architecture
- Sponsored by: Richard H. Driehaus
- Country: Spain; Portugal
- Presented by: Traditional Building Cultures Foundation
- Reward: 50,000€
- First award: 2012; 14 years ago
- Website: Rafael Manzano Prize

The Rafael Manzano Prize for New Traditional Architecture is an award organized by the Traditional Building Cultures Foundation, thanks to Richard H. Driehaus and the collaboration of INTBAU Spain, INTBAU Portugal, the Serra Henriques Foundation, the Royal Academy of Fine Arts of San Fernando and the Ordem dos Arquitectos of Portugal, and with the High Sponsorship of the Presidency of the Portuguese Republic.

It is awarded annually to architects who have carried out, in Portugal or in Spain, restoration works of monuments or other architectural interventions that have stood out for their contribution to the preservation, promotion and dissemination of the values of classical and traditional architecture and urbanism.

The award is named after the architect Rafael Manzano Martos, who has devoted his career to the preservation of the Spanish architectural and urban heritage, both through restoration works and by designing new architecture based on this heritage, for which he received the international 2010 Richard H. Driehaus Prize, becoming the first, and until now the only, Spanish architect to have received this award.

The Prize includes a monetary award of €50,000 and a commemorative medal, making it the largest architecture prize awarded on the Iberian Peninsula.

== History ==
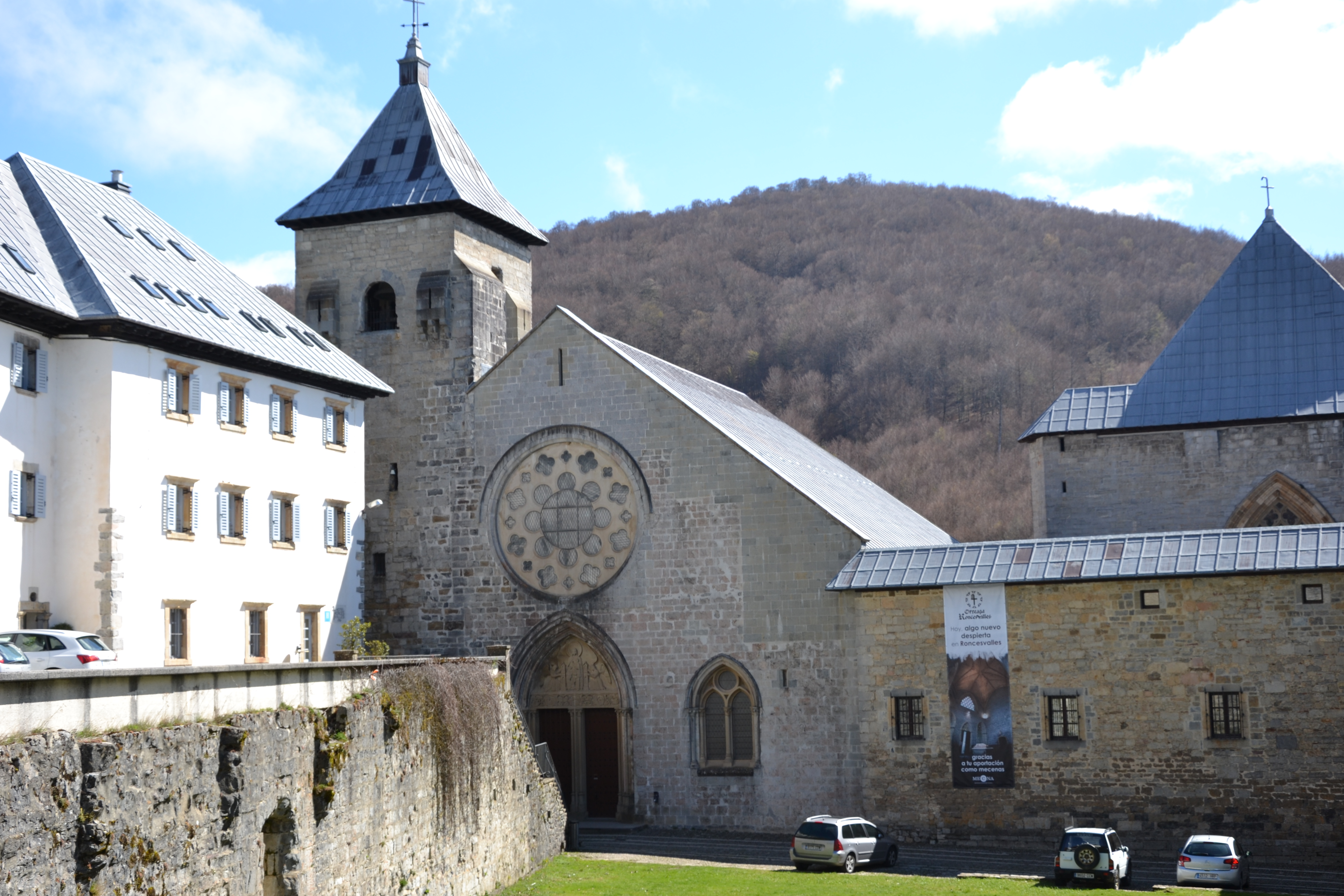
San Agustín Chapel, Real Colegiata de Roncesvalles, Navarra, Spain, restored by Leopoldo Gil Cornet

For his contribution in the defense and promotion of traditional architecture, Rafael Manzano Martos was awarded the 8th Richard H. Driehaus Prize in 2010, granted since 2003 in the United States by the American philanthropist Richard H. Driehaus through the University of Notre Dame School of Architecture.

Coinciding with the presentation of this award to Rafael Manzano, considered as the most important in the world for a career dedicated to traditional and classical architecture, Richard H. Driehaus announced the creation in Spain of a new award to defend the Iberian urban heritage and architectural traditions: the Rafael Manzano Prize for New Traditional Architecture.

This award was first awarded in 2012 at a ceremony held at the Royal Academy of Fine Arts in San Fernando in Madrid, and has been awarded every year since then. In 2017, thanks to the collaboration with the Serra Henriques Foundation and the Portuguese Order of Architects, as well as the High Sponsorship of the Presidency of the Portuguese Republic, the award was extended to Portugal and is now granted to professionals from either country.

== Laureates ==
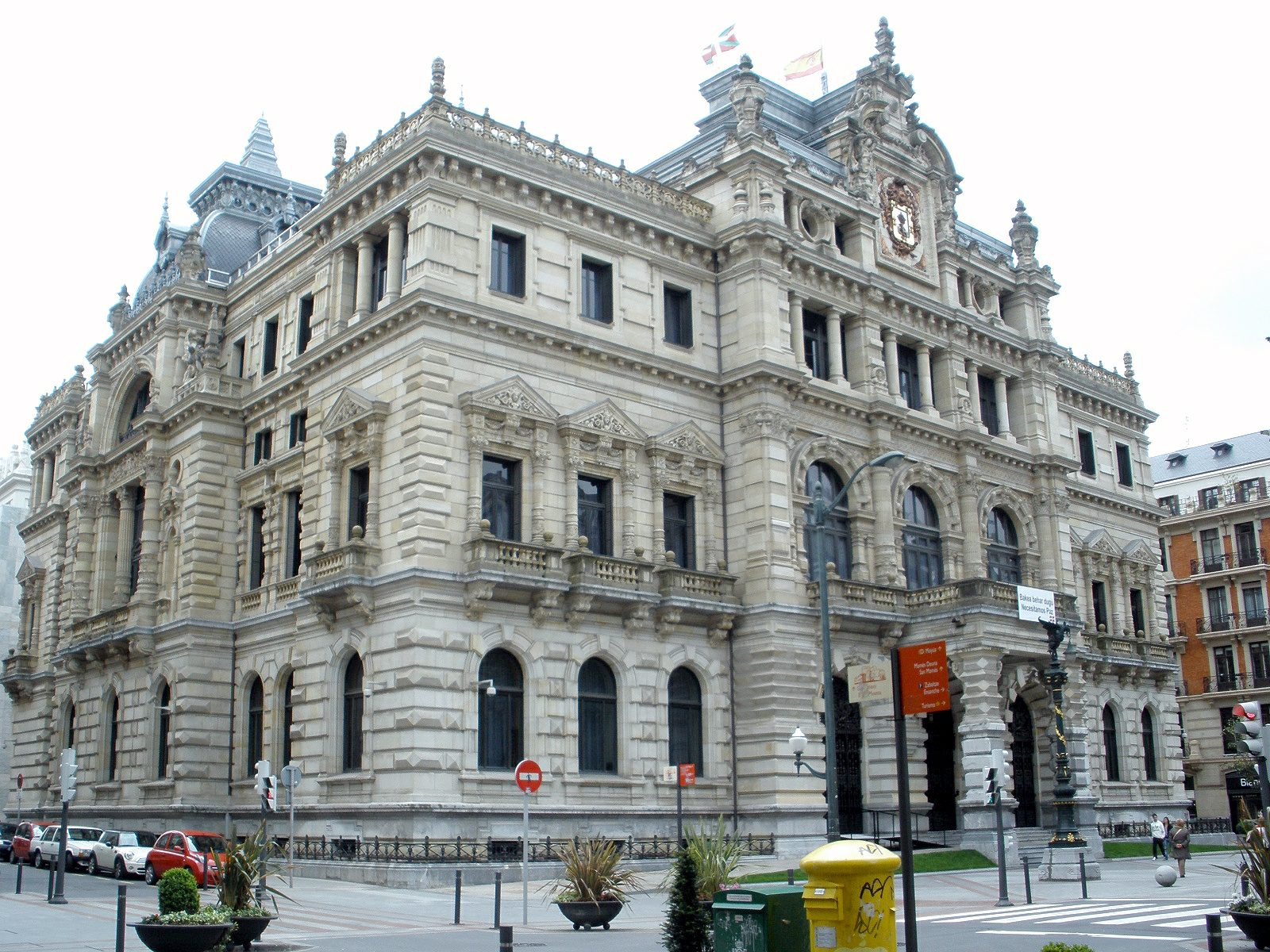
Delegation Palace, Bilbao, Basque Country, Spain, restored by Javier Cenicacelaya & Íñigo Saloña

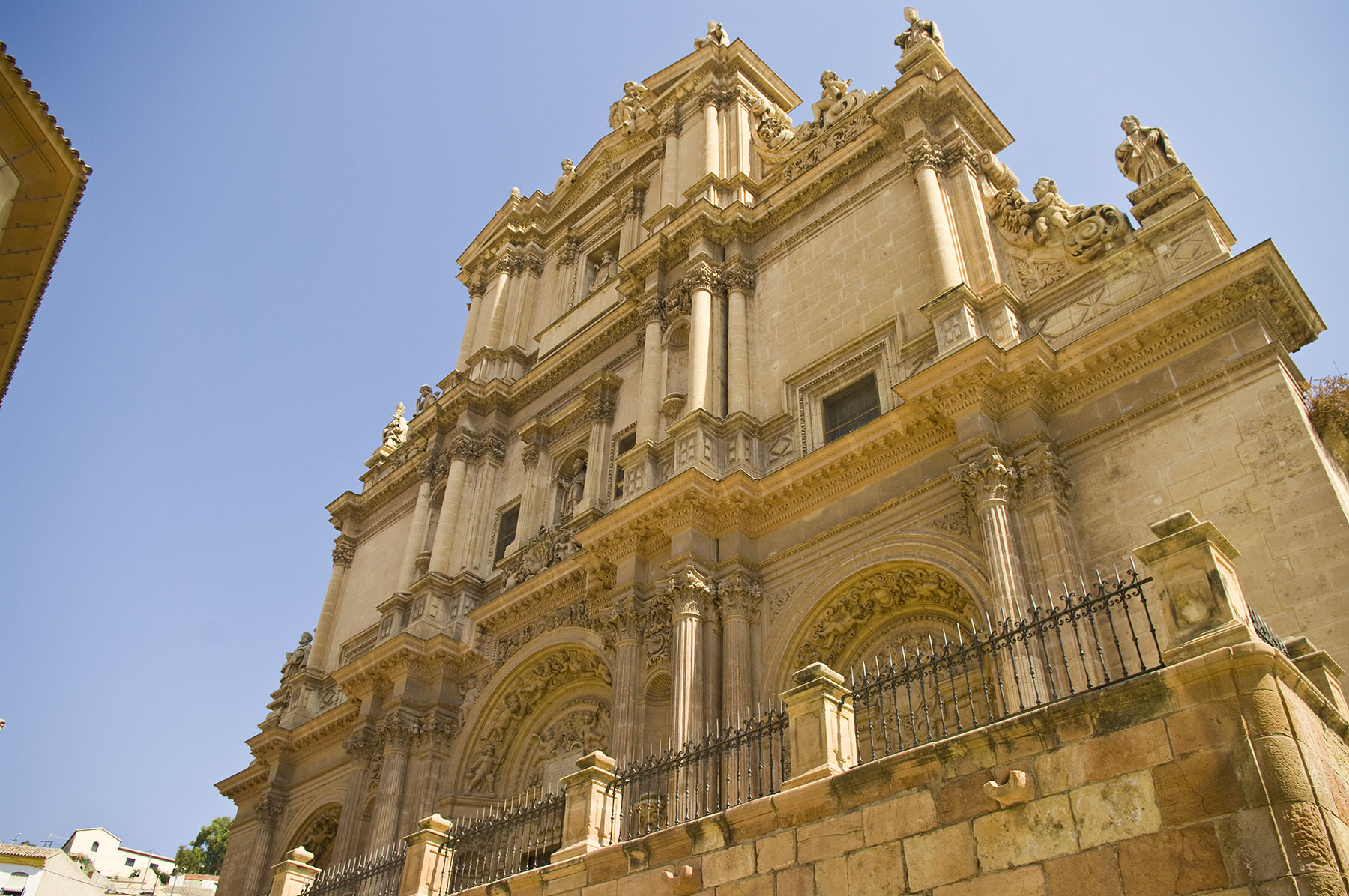
Colegiata de San Patricio, Lorca, Murcia, Spain, restored by Juan de Dios de la Hoz

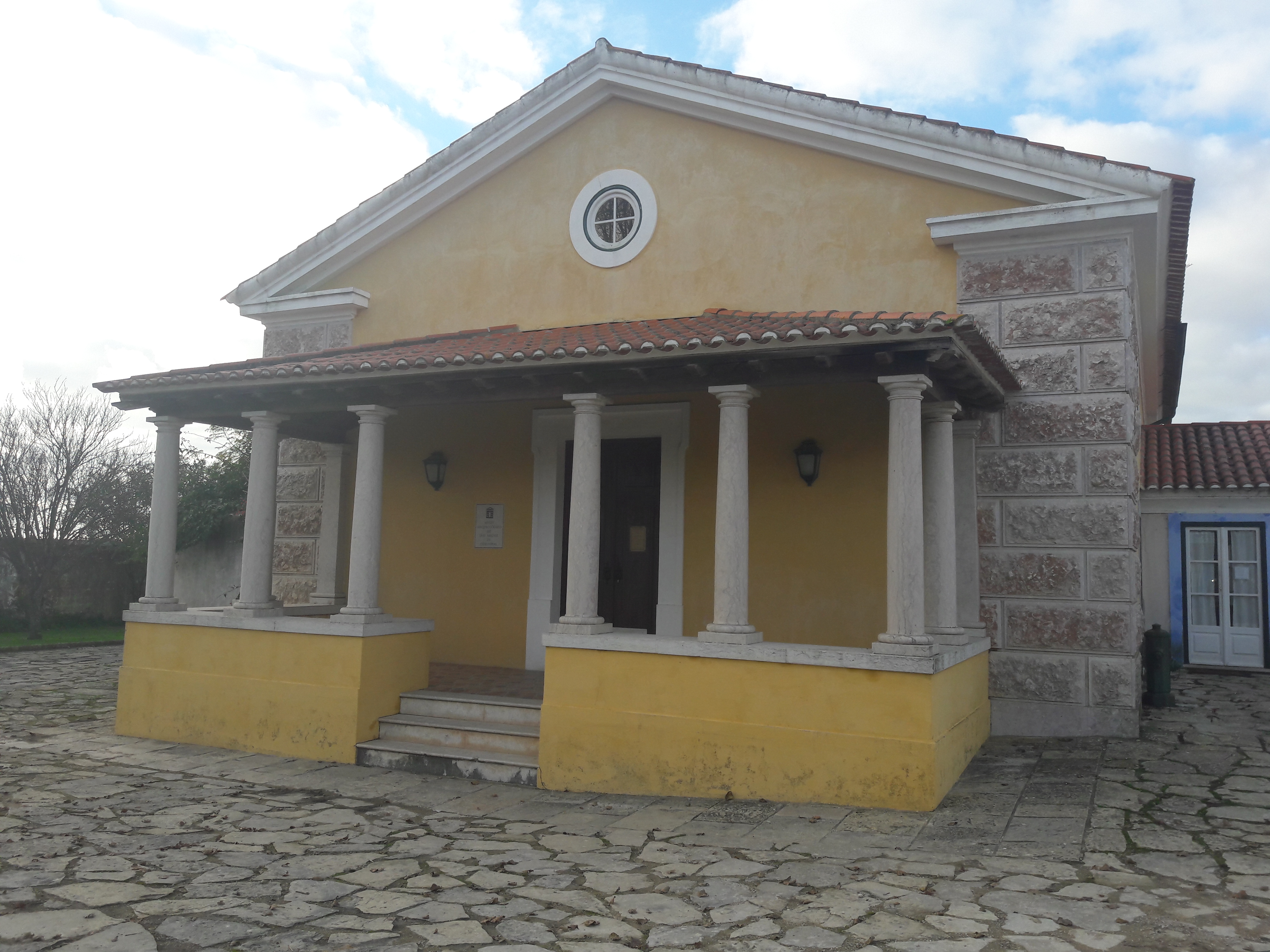
Museum of São Miguel de Odrinhas, Sintra, Portugal, designed by Alberto Castro Nunes & António Maria Braga

Year	Laureate	Nationality	Website	Ref.
2012	Leopoldo Gil Cornet	Spain		
2013	Luis Fernando Gomez-Estern & Ignacio Medina	Spain	OTAISA	
2014	Javier Cenicacelaya & Íñigo Saloña	Spain	Cenicacelaya & Salona	
2015	Donald Gray	Australia		
2016	Enrique Nuere Matauco	Spain	Taujel Carpintería Histórica	
2017	José Baganha	Portugal	José Baganha & Arquitectos Associados	
2018	Juan de Dios de la Hoz	Spain	Arquitectos Lavila	
2019	Alberto Castro Nunes & António Maria Braga	Portugal		
2020	Fernando Martín Sanjuán	Spain	Fernando Martín Sanjuán Arquitecto	
2021	Sergi Bastidas	Spain	Bastidas Architecture	
2023	Luís Rebelo de Andrade	Portugal	Rebelo de Andrade Architecture & Design	
2024	Juan Luis Camacho	Spain	Arquichinchón	

== See also ==
- New Classical Architecture
- Traditional Architecture
- Driehaus Architecture Prize
- New Urbanism
