= Edward Burling =

Edward Burling may refer to:

- Edward J. Burling (1819–1892), American architect
- Edward B. Burling (1870–1966), American lawyer
