= Pierre P. Ferry House =

Historic house in Seattle, Washington, U.S.

- U.S. National Register of Historic Places
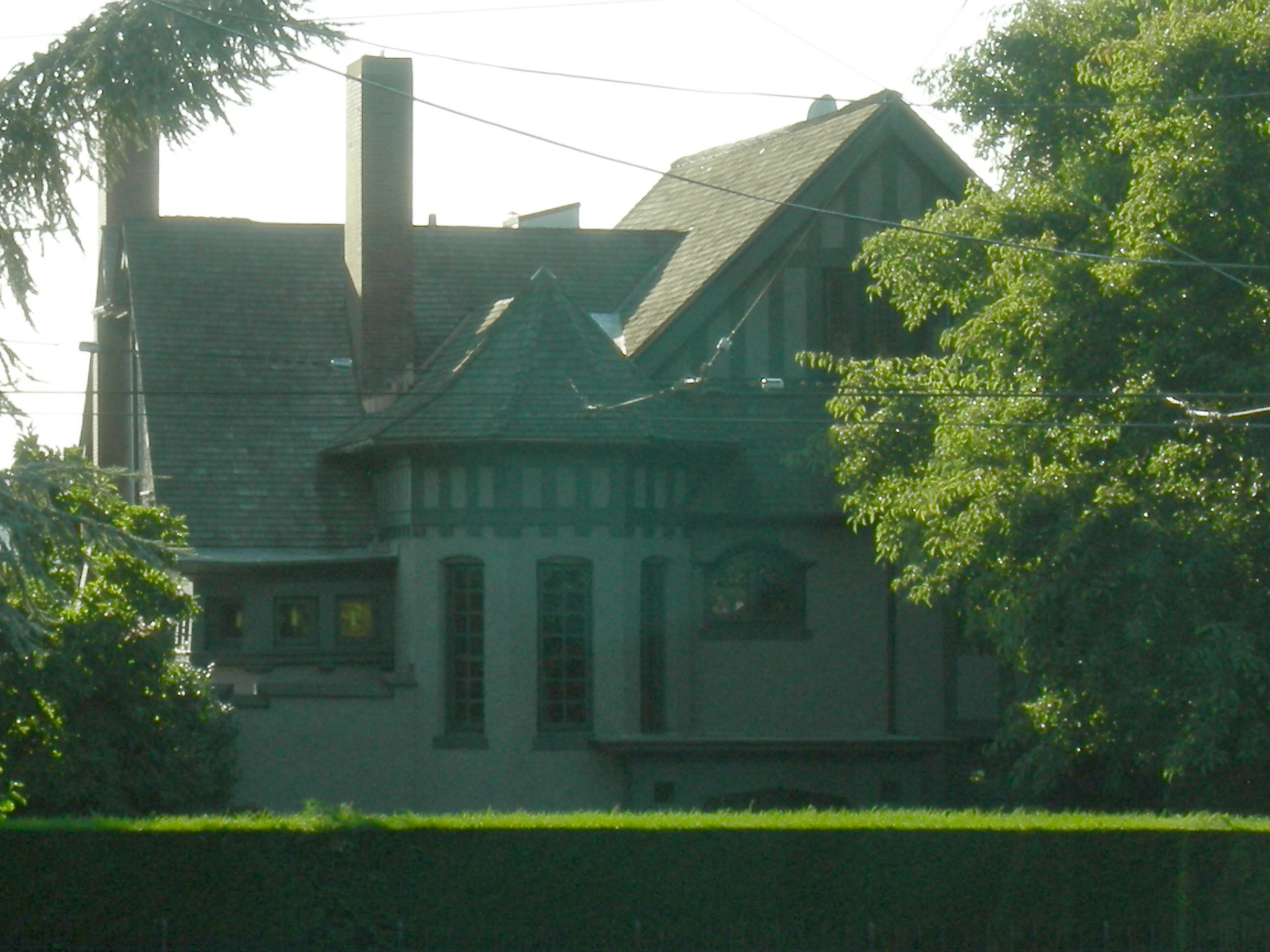

- Location within Washington (state)
- Location: 1531 10th Ave., E., Seattle, Washington
- Coordinates: 47°38′3″N 122°19′8″W
- Area: 1.5 acres (0.61 ha)
- Built: 1904
- Architect: John Graham, Sr.
- Architectural style: American Craftsman
- NRHP reference No.: 79002537
- Added to NRHP: April 18, 1979

The Pierre P. Ferry House (1903–1906) is a historic home in Seattle, Washington, United States.

== History ==
The American Craftsman home was designed for attorney Pierre Ferry by Seattle architect John Graham. The art glass windows in the main hall with the elaborate peacock were designed by Tiffany Studios. Orlando Giannini of the Chicago firm Giannini & Hilgart designed the mosaic with its wisteria motif. It is regarded as the finest Arts and Crafts residence in the Pacific Northwest.

The building has status as a Seattle landmark and is listed on the National Register of Historic Places.
