= Driehaus Museum =

Museum in Chicago, Illinois

Richard H. Driehaus Museum
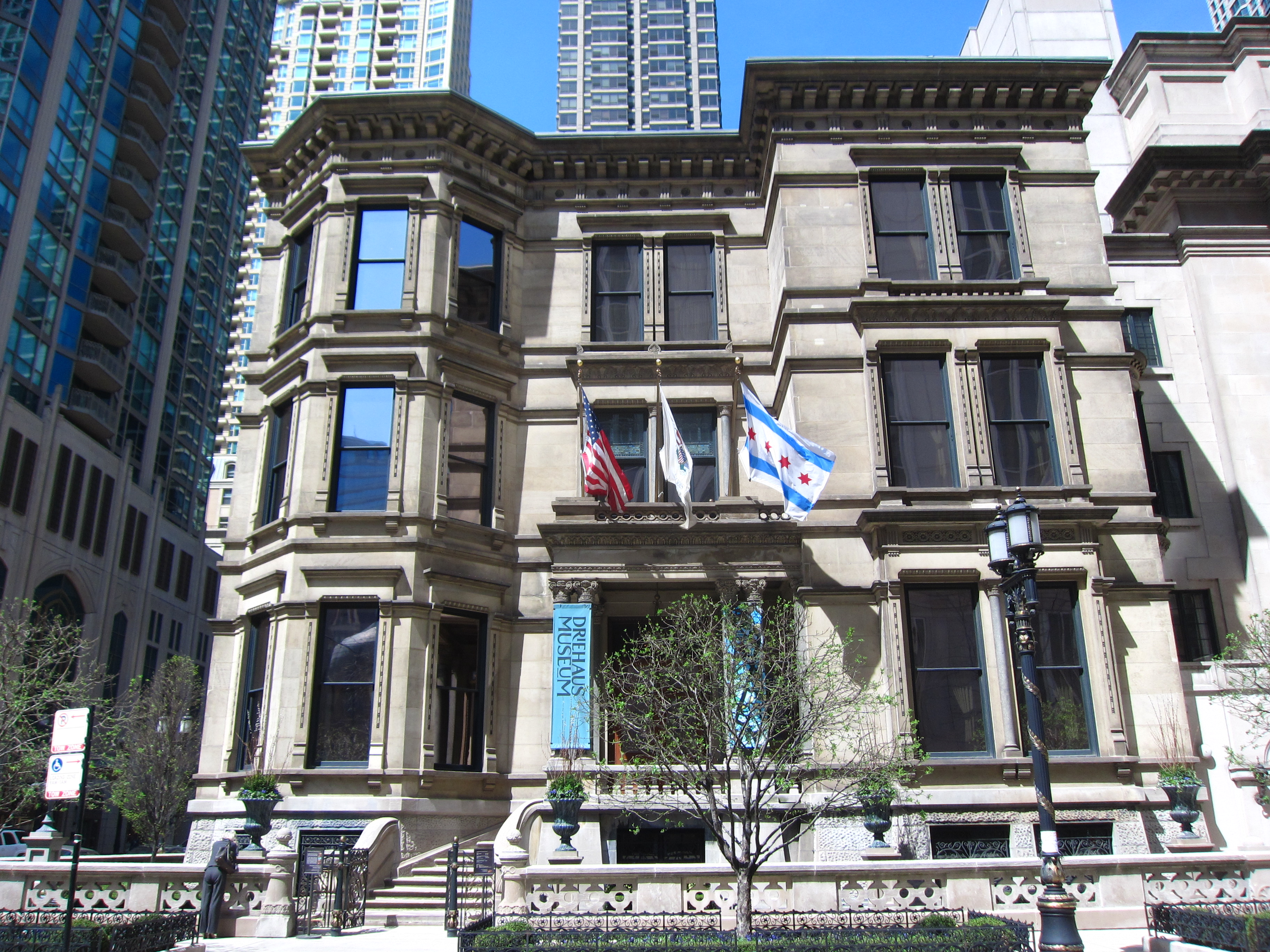
- Established: 2003
- Location: 50 East Erie Street; Chicago, Illinois; United States
- Coordinates: 41°53′40″N 87°37′36″W
- Type: Decorative Arts Museum
- Public transit access: CTA bus routes: Routes 3, 10, 26, 36, 125, 143, 146–148 and 151; Chicago 'L': Chicago Station; Grand Station
- Website: www.driehausmuseum.org

The Richard H. Driehaus Museum is a museum located at 50 East Erie Street on the Near North Side in Chicago, Illinois, near the Magnificent Mile. The museum is housed within the historic Samuel M. Nickerson House, the 1883 residence of a wealthy Chicago banker. Although the mansion has been restored, the Driehaus Museum does not re-create the Nickerson period but rather broadly interprets and displays the prevailing design, architecture, and decorating tastes of Gilded Age America and the Art Nouveau era in permanent and special exhibitions.

The interiors are replete with marble, onyx, carved exotic and domestic woods, glazed tiles, and stained glass. On display are original furnishings from the Nickerson era along with American and European decorative arts of the late 19th and early 20th centuries, including Art Nouveau furnishings and a number of works by Louis Comfort Tiffany. The museum is named after its founder, the Chicago businessman, philanthropist, and art collector Richard H. Driehaus. The artworks on display in the museum are selections from the private Driehaus Collection of Fine and Decorative Arts.

== History ==
The mansion was designed for Samuel M. Nickerson by one of Chicago's earliest prominent architects, Edward J. Burling of the architectural firm of Burling & Whitehouse. Construction took four years and cost $450,000; it was reportedly the most expensive and elaborate private residence in Chicago at the time of its completion in 1883. Samuel Nickerson hailed from Brewster, Massachusetts, where he constructed Fieldstone Hall as his family's summer house.

The Nickerson family lived in the mansion from 1883 to 1900. They sold the house and property to the paper magnate Lucius George Fisher, who lived there until his death in 1916. In 1919, a group of prominent Chicagoans purchased the home and presented the deed as a gift to the American College of Surgeons, who used the building as administrative space until 1965. From 1965 to 2003 it was leased by the College of Surgeons to various tenants.

The building was added to the National Register of Historic Places in 1976 and designated a Chicago landmark on September 28, 1977.

In 2003 Richard H. Driehaus acquired the building, established it as a museum, and commissioned the building's award-winning restoration with a vision to preserve and promote classical architecture and design. The Driehaus Museum opened to the public in June 2008.

In 2022, the Driehaus Museum acquired the adjacent John B. Murphy Memorial Auditorium, also a Chicago landmark building, and on June 21, 2024 opened the expanded Driehaus Museum campus.

== Collection ==
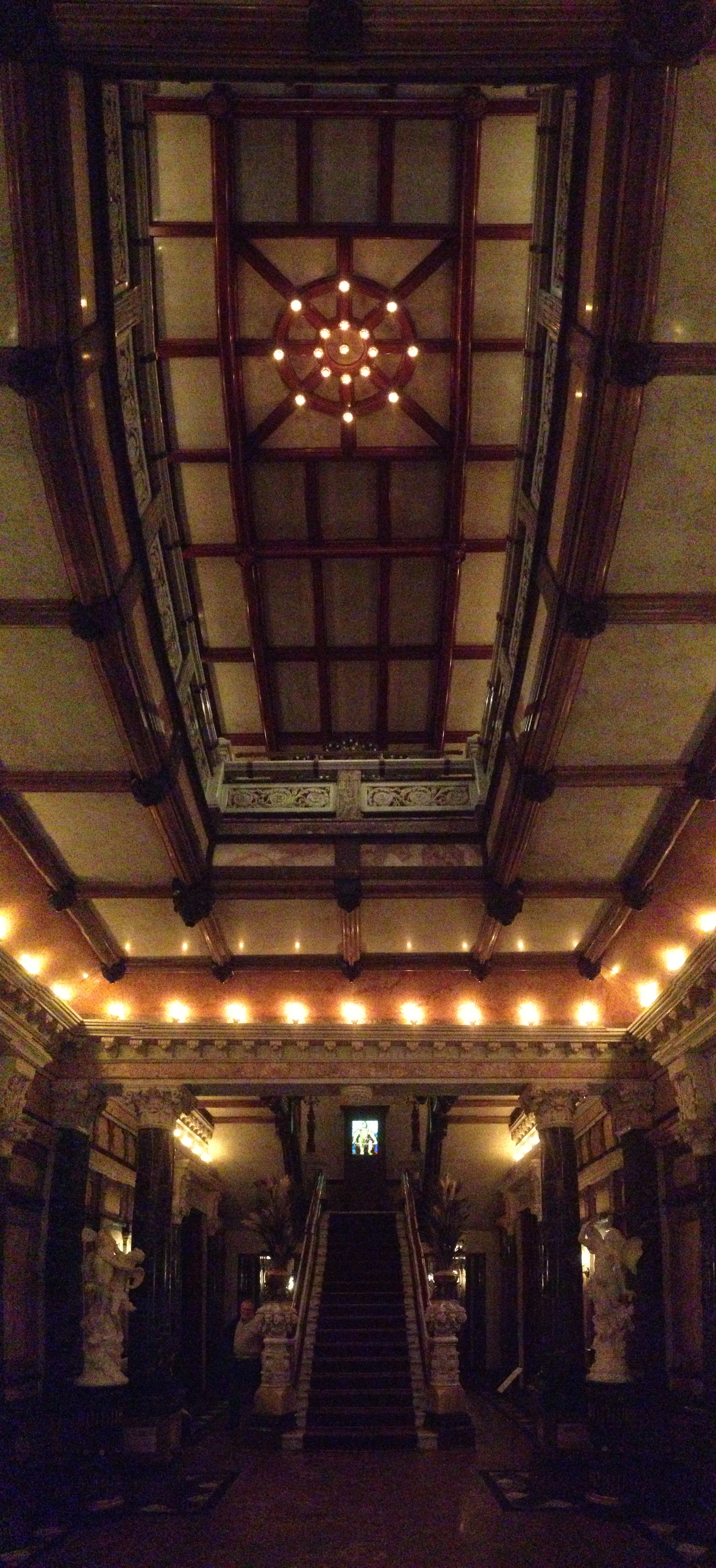
looking up and towards the main stairwell from the first floor

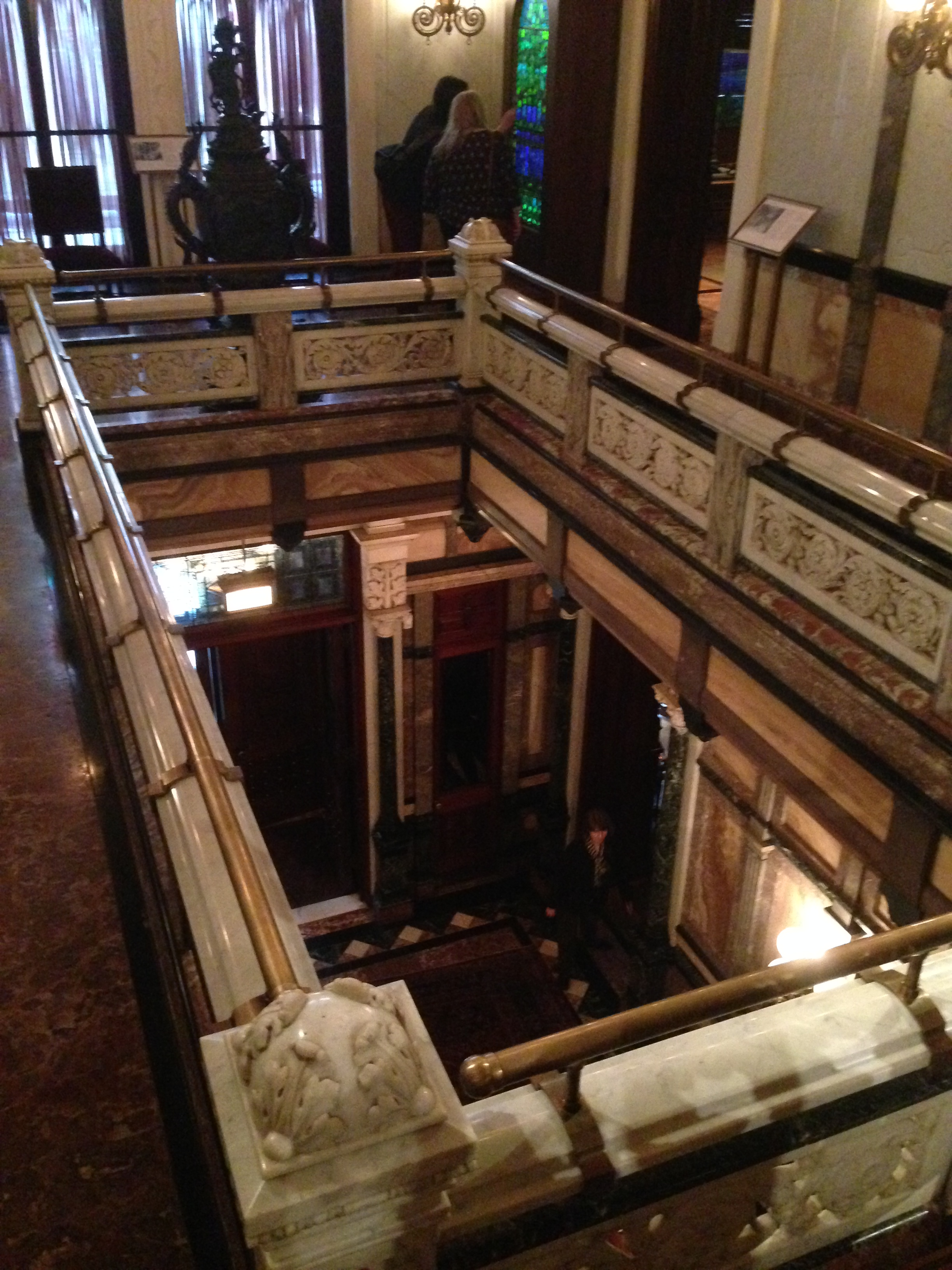
Looking down from the second floor

The Main Hall of the Driehaus Museum. The hall incorporates 17 types of marble as well as onyx and alabaster in its design, which gave rise to its nickname The Marble Palace in the late 19th century. On the left, looking up and towards the main stairwell from the first floor. On the right, looking down into the first floor from the second.

Inside the museum, objects from the Driehaus Collection are displayed as a complement to the preserved interiors and some original furnishings.

The Driehaus Collection is one of the significant collections in the country of works by Louis Comfort Tiffany and his associated firms. Richard H. Driehaus acquired his first Tiffany work, a stained-glass window, in 1978, and in the years since his collection has grown to include over 1,500 objects, including Favrile glass, vases, furniture, accessories, and stained and leaded-glass windows.

Highlights of the Tiffany objects on permanent display in the Driehaus Museum include a set of brightly colored iridescent stemware; large fire screen with iridescent chain mail tiles; unique centerpiece lamp with a base of eight large nautilus shells; and green blown-glass humidor.

Among the museum's collection of furniture is a suite of carved neo-Empire maple chairs by George A. Schastey & Co. of New York, one of the original decorators of the Nickerson House; a rare Chickering and Sons grand piano from the Driehaus Collection; and a Nickerson-era Herter Brothers extension dining table of quarter-sawn white oak.

Other highlights include a brass chandelier from Thurlow Lodge with boars’ heads, hunting arrows, and hunting horns; Émile Gallé vases; Sèvres vases; gilt-bronze mantel clock by Deniére; paintings by members of the Pre-Raphaelite Brotherhood; and a dramatic Venetian marble sculpture by Oscar Spalmach depicting the mythical figures of Cupid and Psyche.

The second floor of the Driehaus Museum, formerly the living quarters of the Nickerson family, is more sparsely decorated and is designated as exhibition space.

The third floor consists of a ballroom where most of the museum's public programs take place and a lounge where visitors can sit on an Art Nouveau furniture suite by Edward Colonna.

== Programs and tours ==
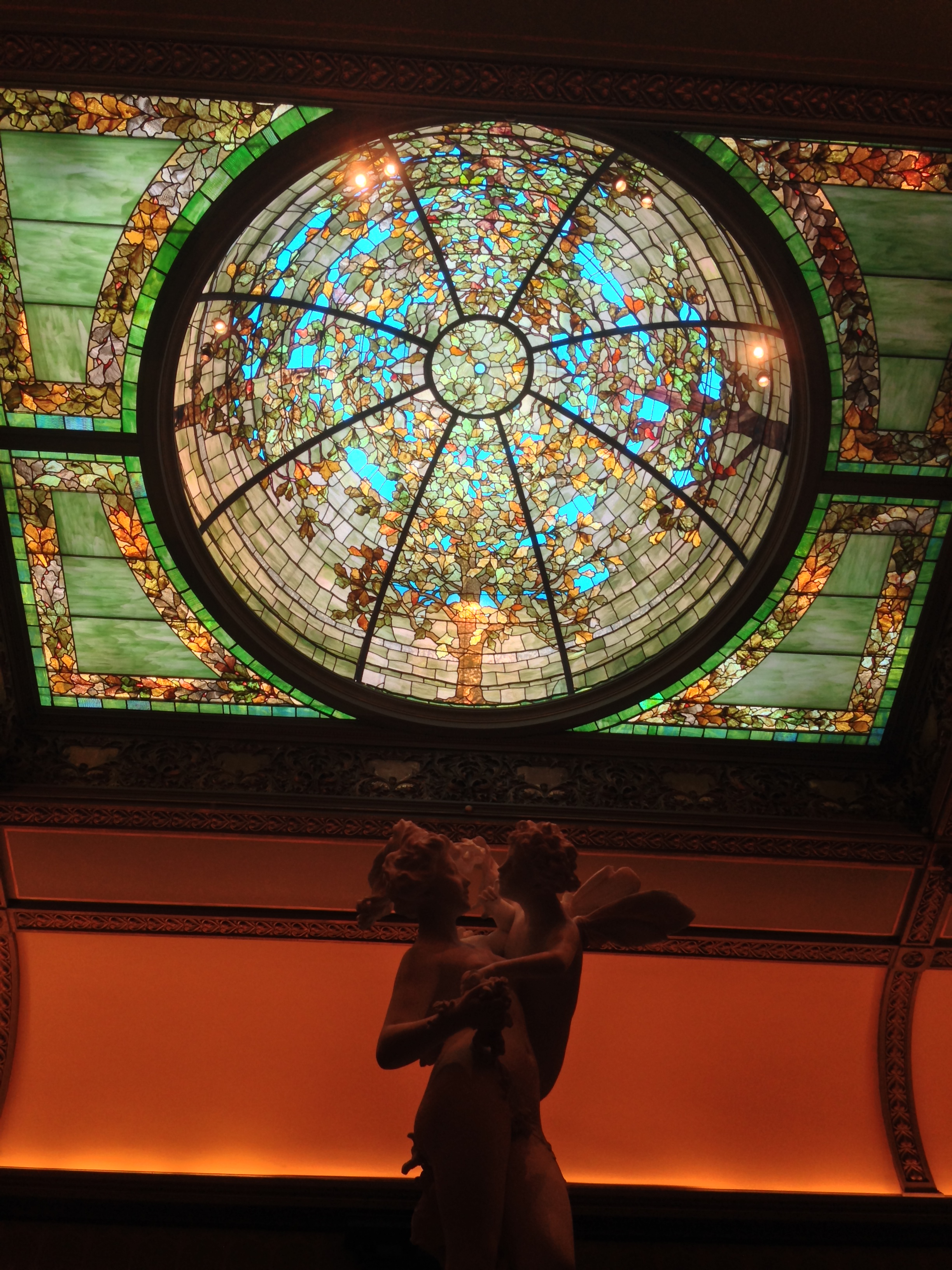
The Sculpture Gallery. Note the elaborate stained glass.

The museum offers guided tours daily in addition to general admission.

The following themed tours are also offered on a seasonal basis: the living history-style Servants’ Tour featuring the mansions’ servants’ quarters and led by a fictional housekeeper; McCormickville Walking Tour of the surrounding historic neighborhood; and evening Twilight Tour discussing how the Nickersons and other Gilded Age Chicago elite socialized and spent their evening hours.

The Driehaus Museum also regularly produces public programs—including concerts, lectures, and family programs—that align with its mission to promote architectural preservation, the decorative arts, and Gilded Age culture. Examples of regular programs include a quarterly jazz concert featuring members of the Chicago Jazz Orchestra and the Samuel M. Nickerson Lecture Series, which features scholars in late 19th and early 20th century design, architecture, and decorative arts.

== Driehaus Gallery of Stained Glass ==
The museum operated the Driehaus Gallery of Stained Glass at the Navy Pier. The gallery showcased eleven Tiffany stained glass windows that included ecclesiastical, landscape and figural themes, and a large fire screen. The gallery closed in 2017.

== Gallery ==
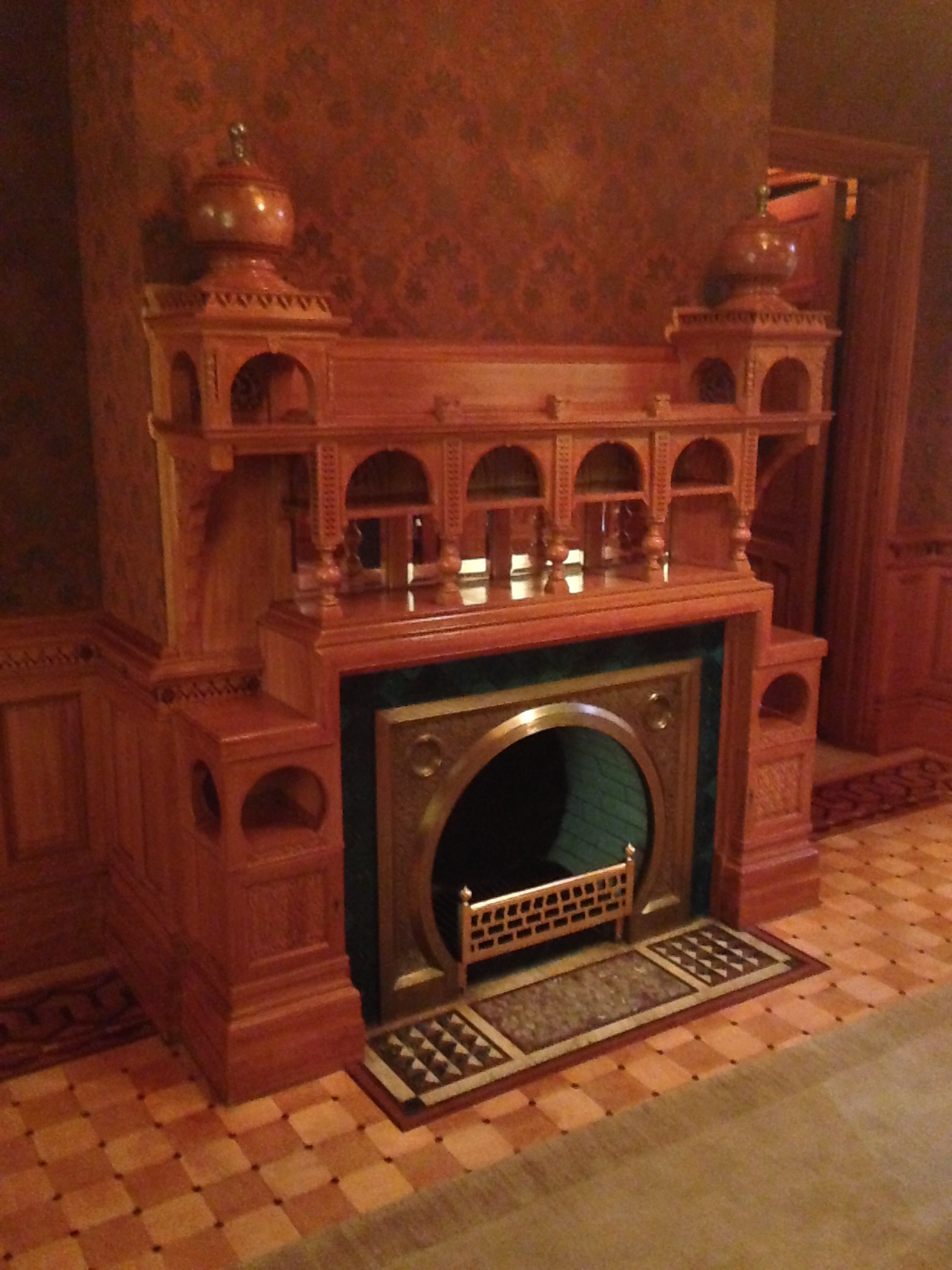
Fireplace

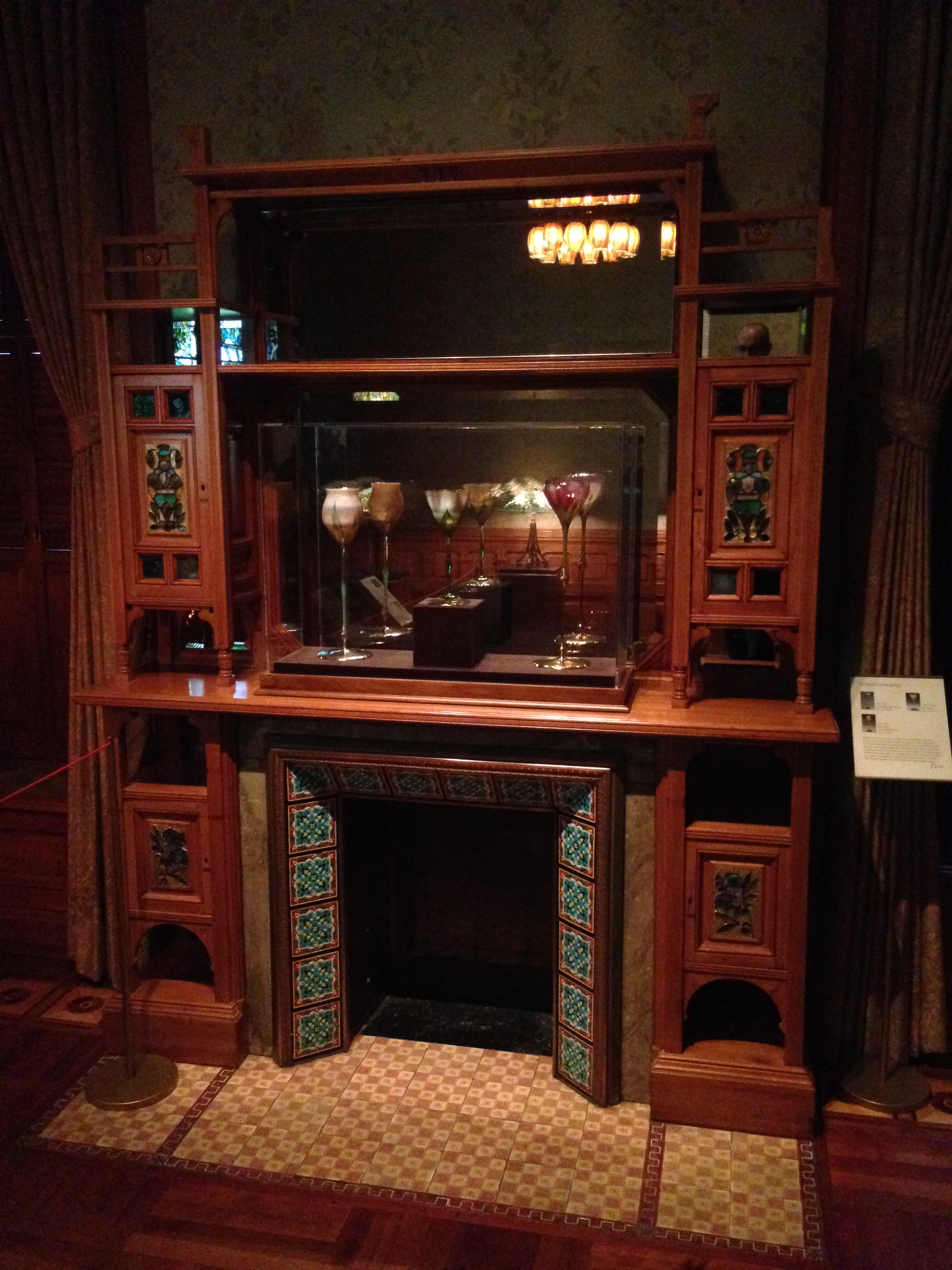
Fireplace

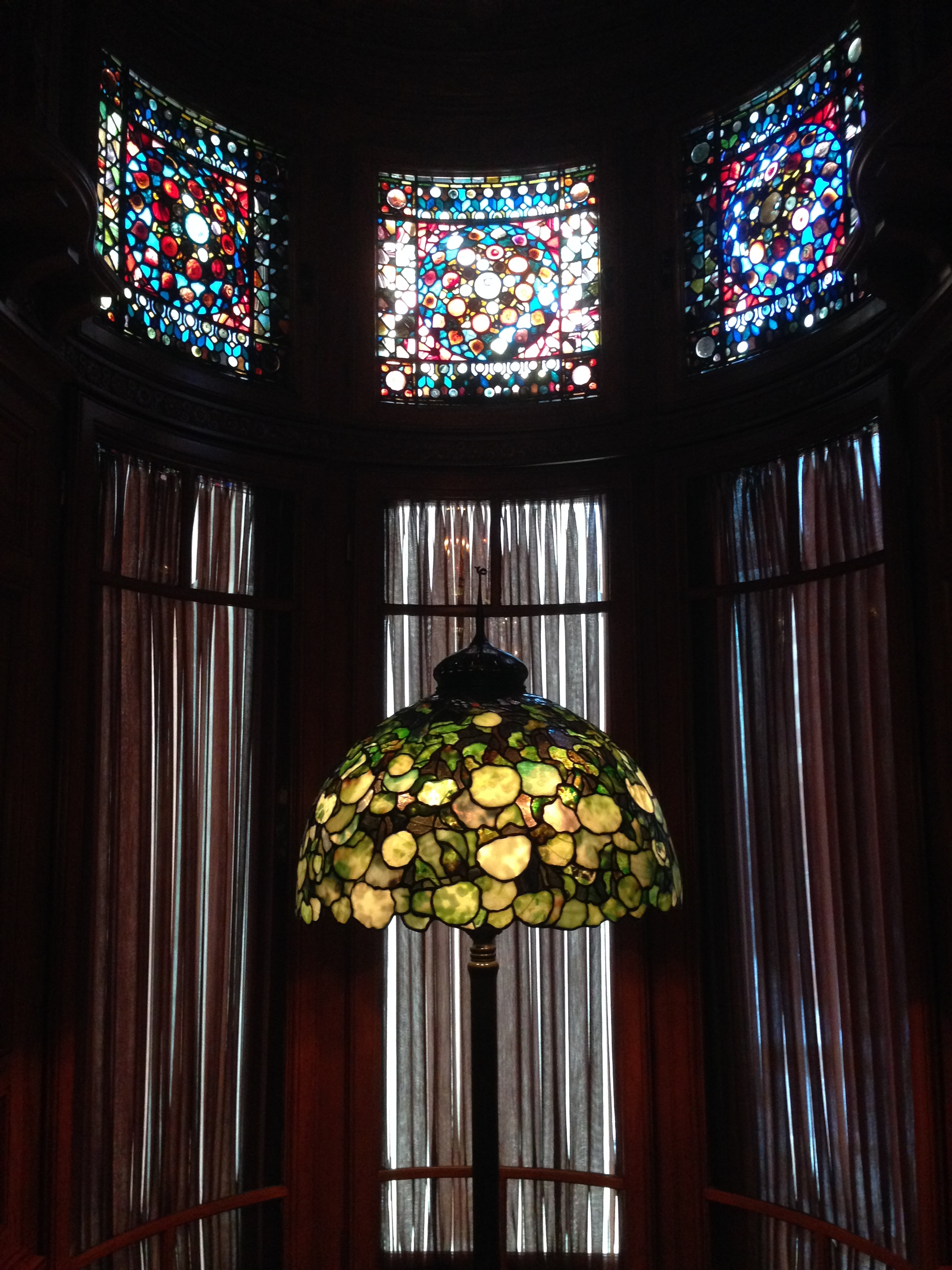
Glass detail

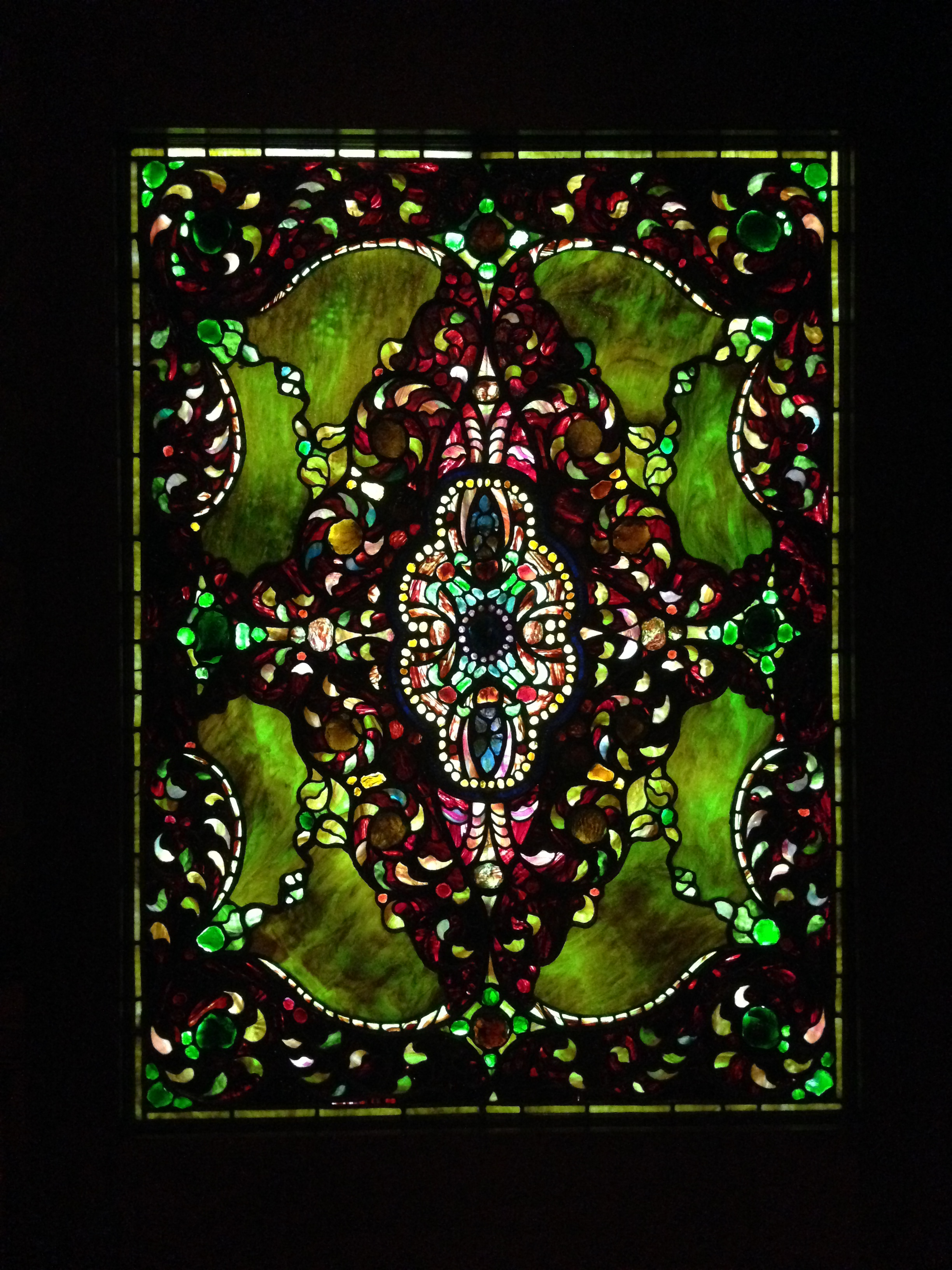
Tiffany Glass on display in the museum

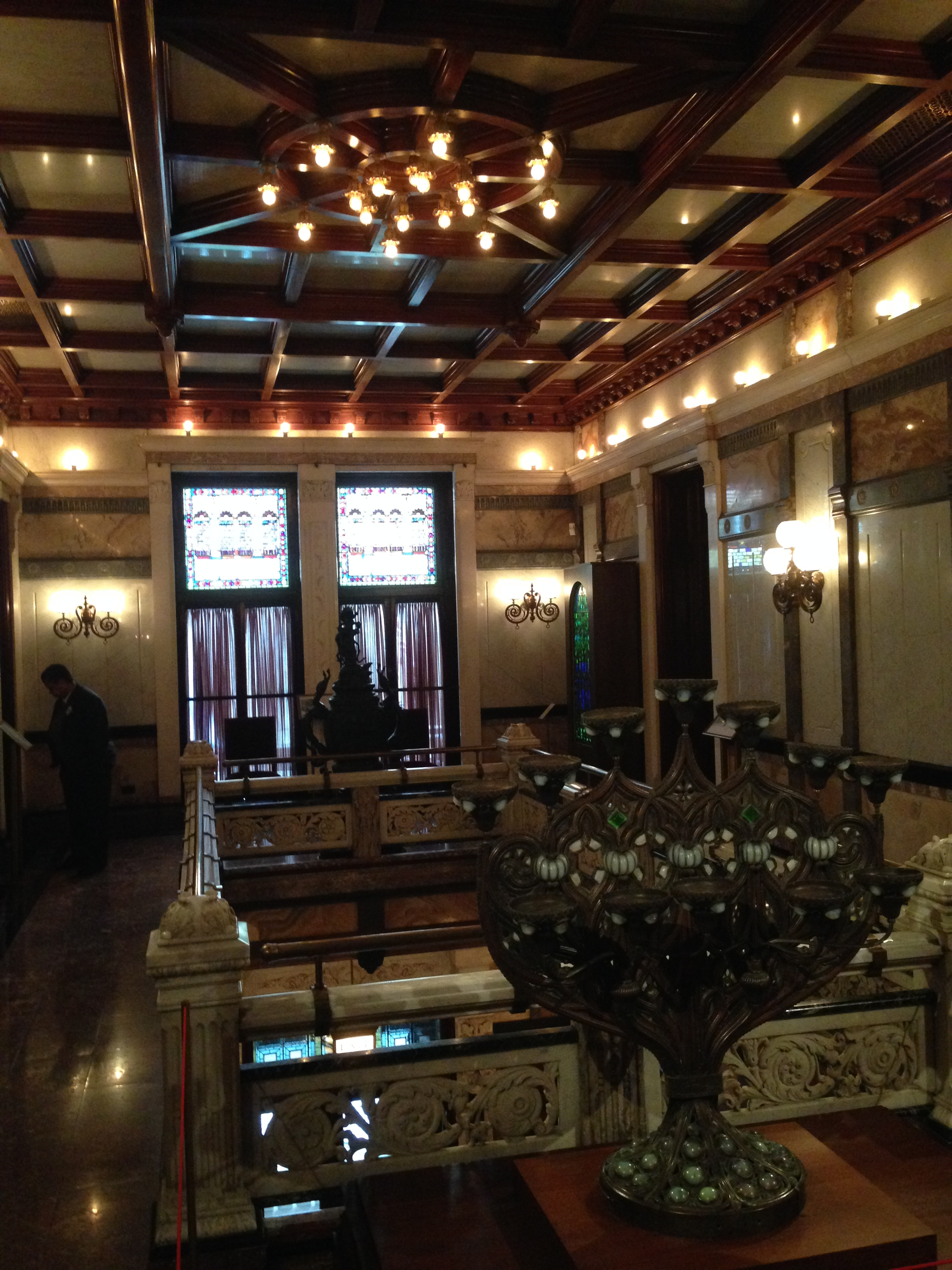
Second Floor

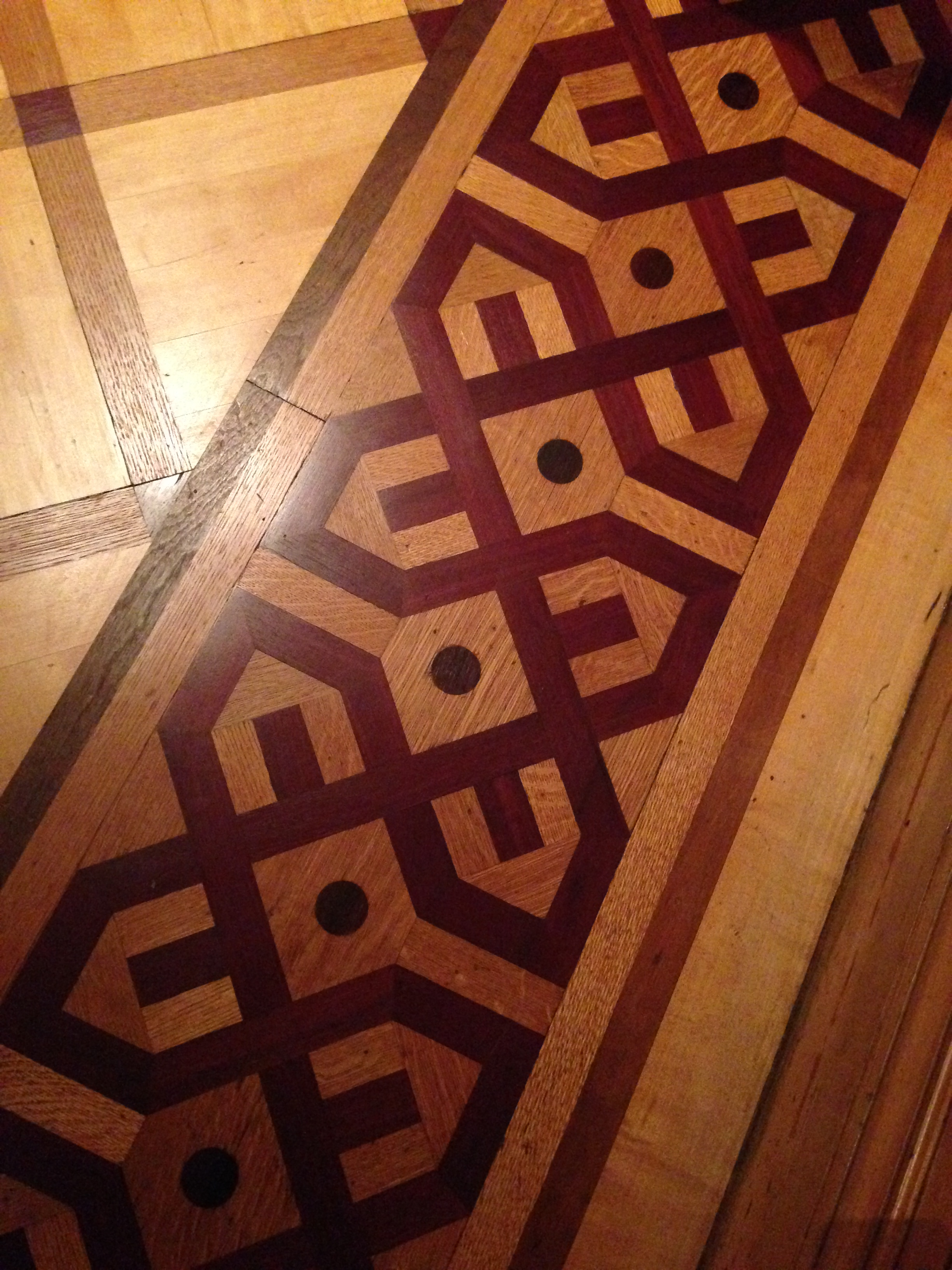
Parquet floor detail

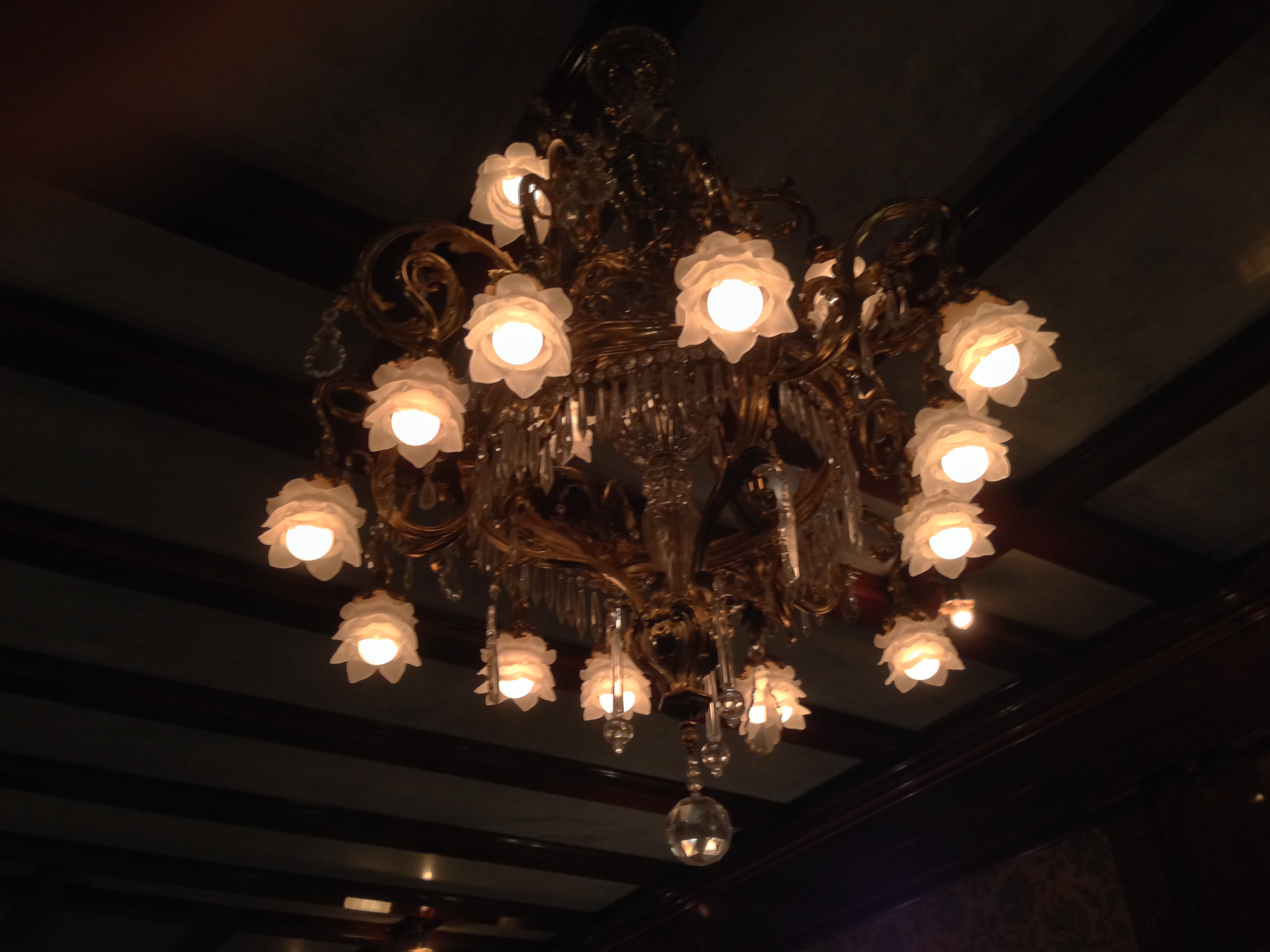
Chandelier

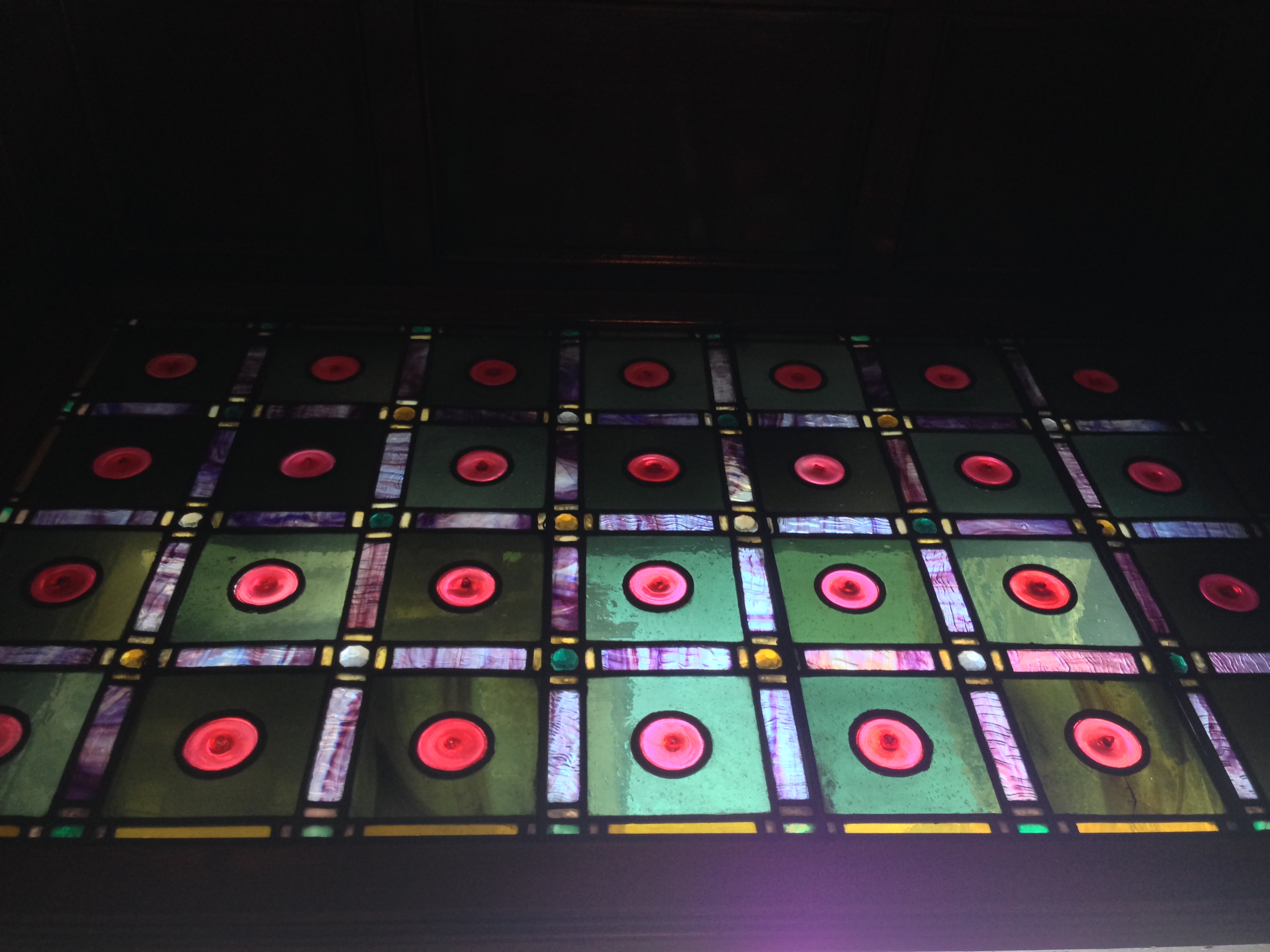
Glass detail

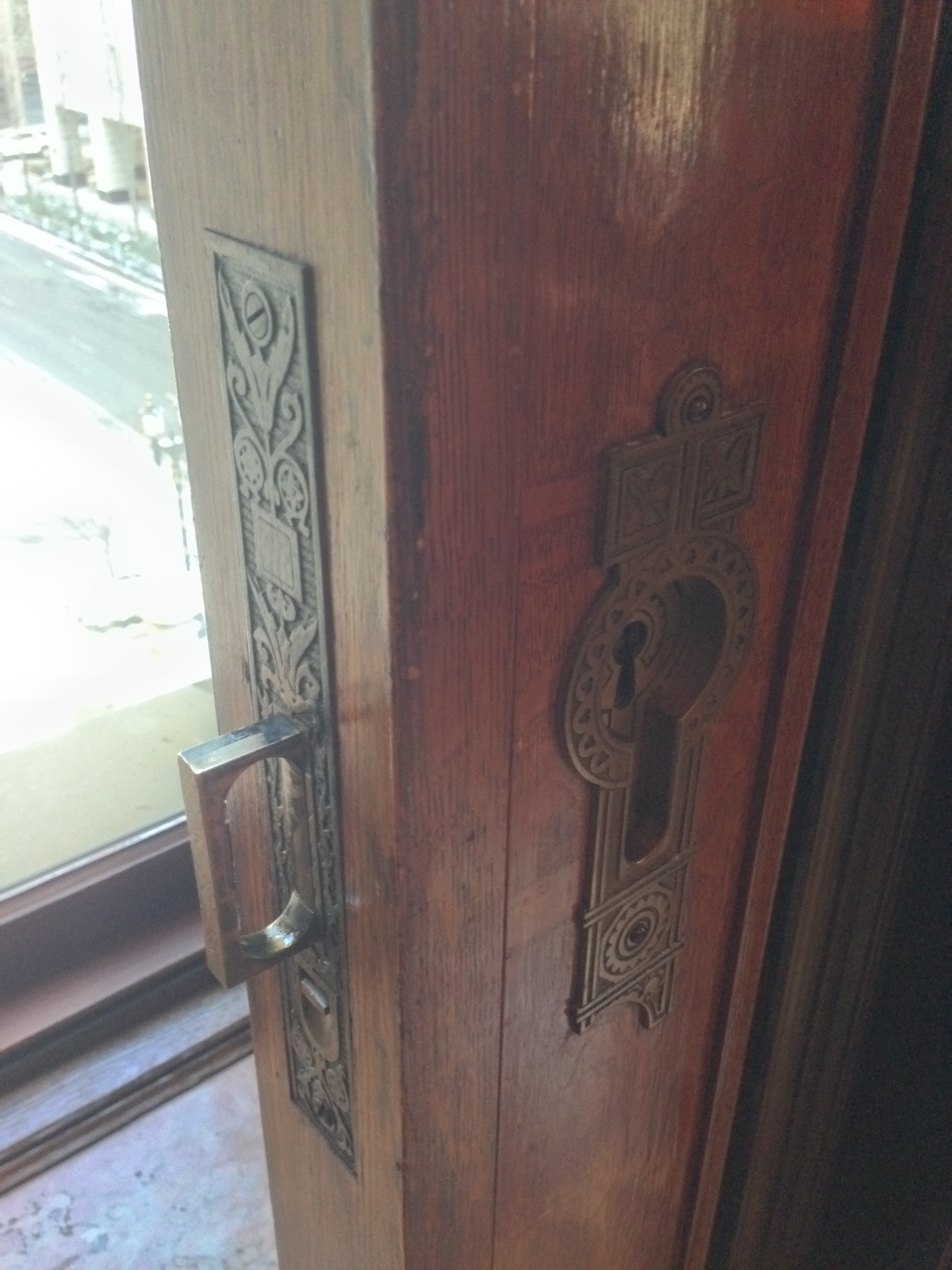
Door lock detail

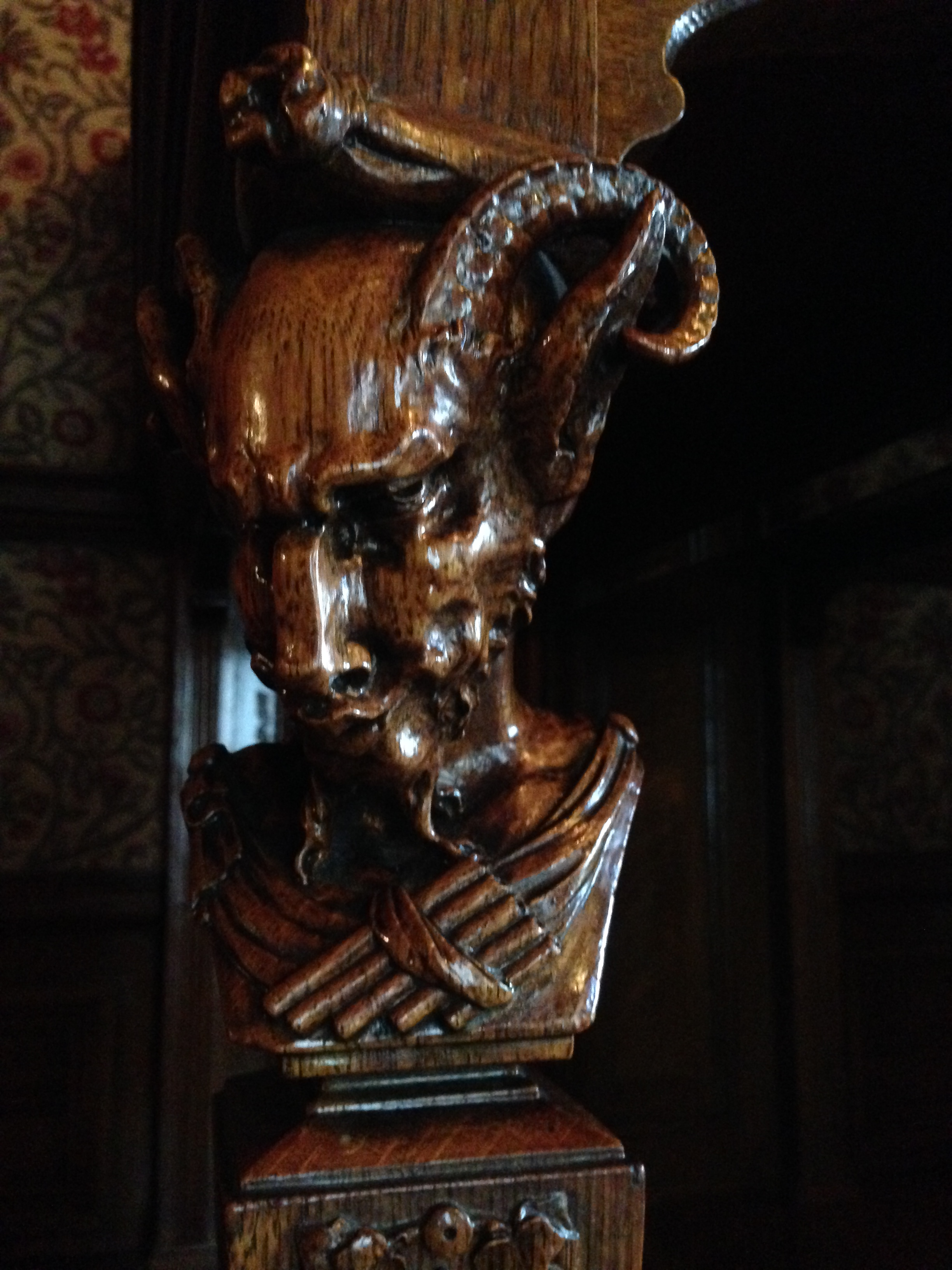
Fireplace sculpture detail

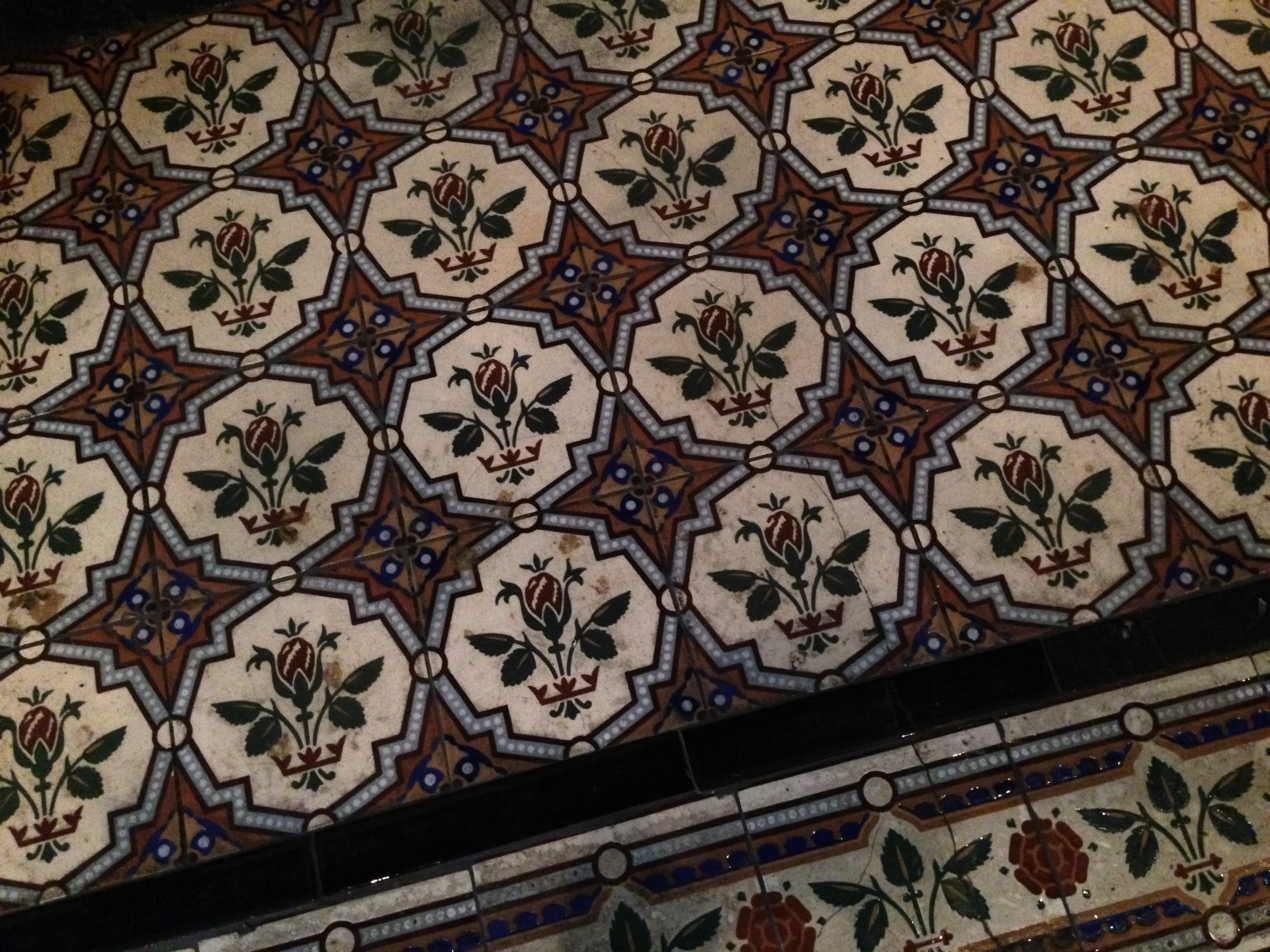
Tile detail

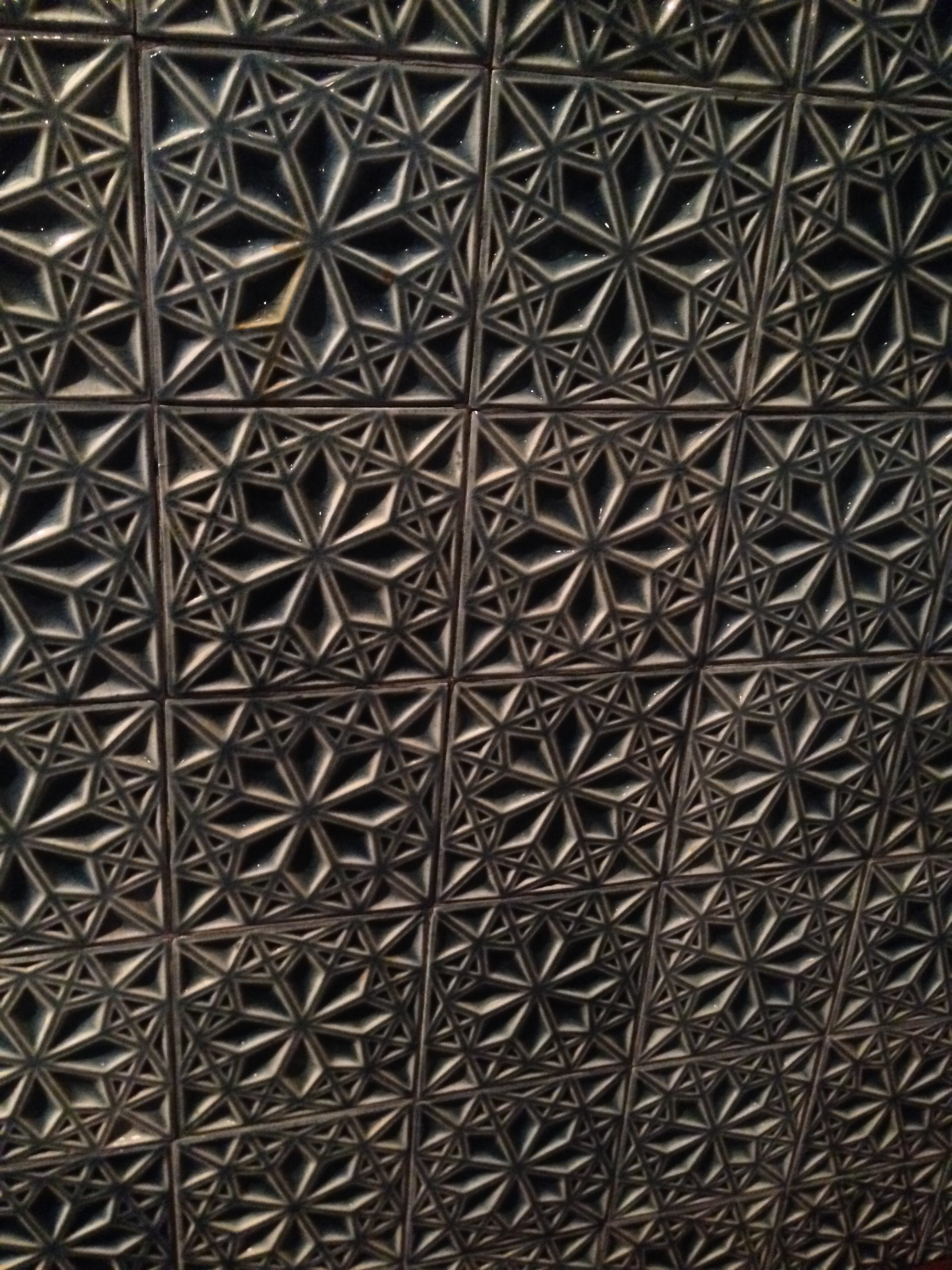
Tile detail
