= J. & J. G. Low Art Tile Works =

Defunct American tile manufacturer

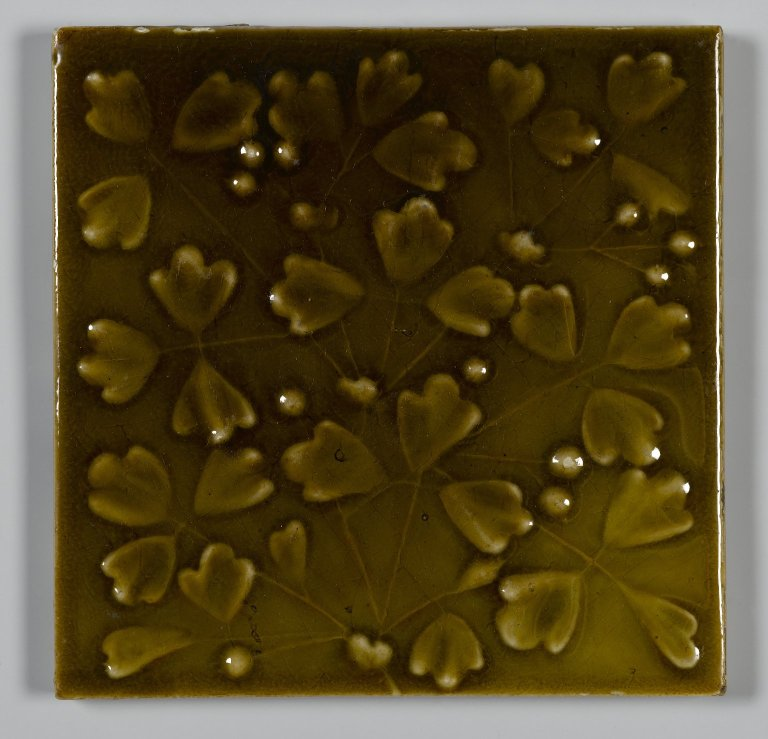
Tile by J. & J. G. Low Art Tile Works, between 1879 and 1883

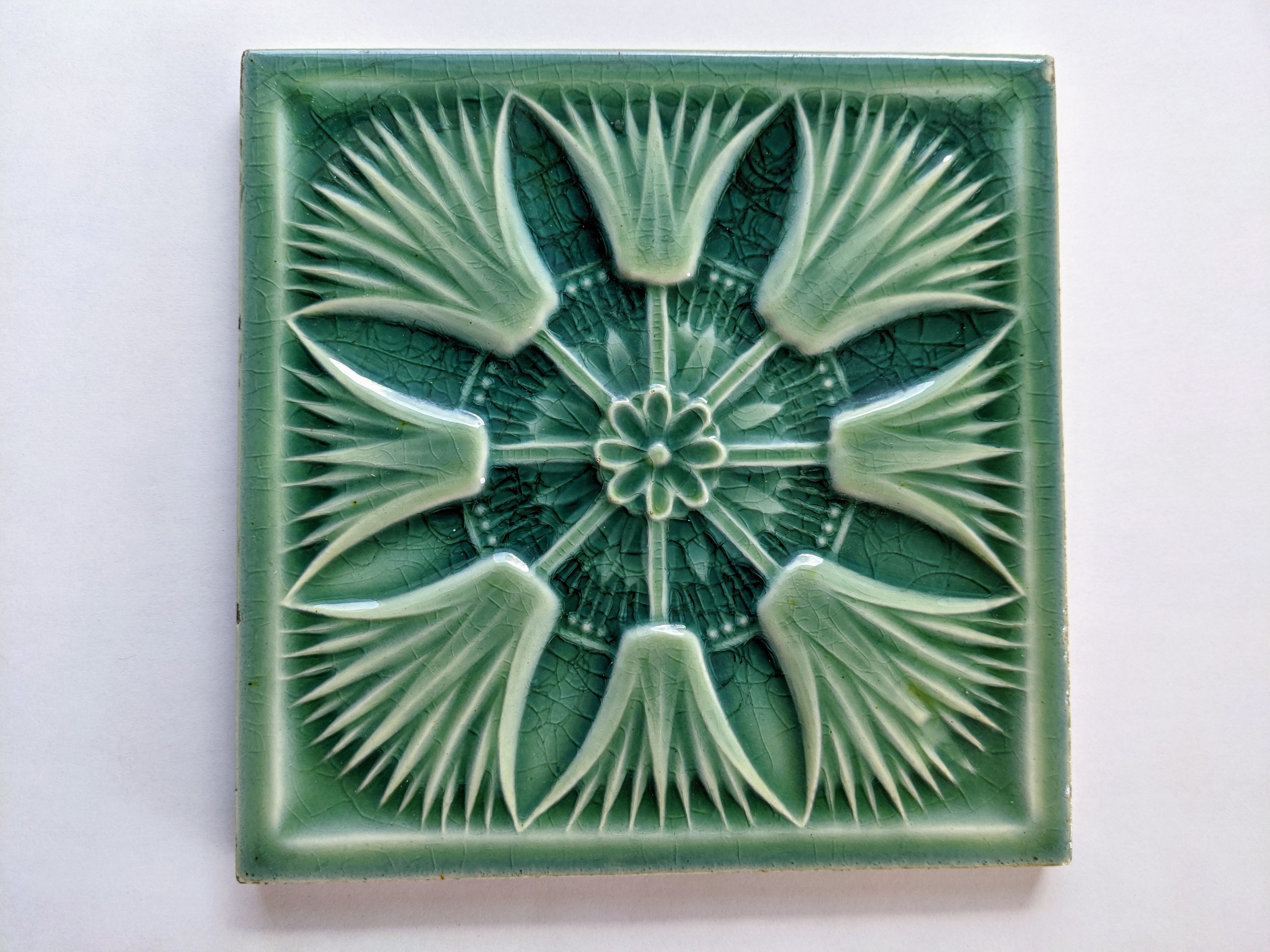
J. & J. G. Low Art Tile Works design 68

J. & J. G. Low Art Tile Works, also known as J. & J. F. Low Art Tile Works or Low Art Tile Works, was an American manufacturer of decorative ceramic tiles, active from 1877 to 1902 in Chelsea, Massachusetts.

The company was founded by John Gardner Low, along with his father John Low, after seeing European tiles at the 1876 Centennial Exhibition in Philadelphia. Its name later changed when J. F. Low, son of John Gardner Low, replaced his retired grandfather.

During the 1880s, the company won awards in the United States and Europe for its high relief decorative art tiles, which ornamented such objects as candlesticks, cast-iron stoves, clocks, fireplace surrounds, soda fountains, trivets, and walls.

Several chemists and designers who worked for Low Art Tile Works later started their own companies, including William H. Grueby of the Grueby Faience Company, Arthur Osborne of Ivorex plaques, and George W. Robertson of the Robertson Art Tile Company.
