= Giannini & Hilgart =

Chicago stained glass firm

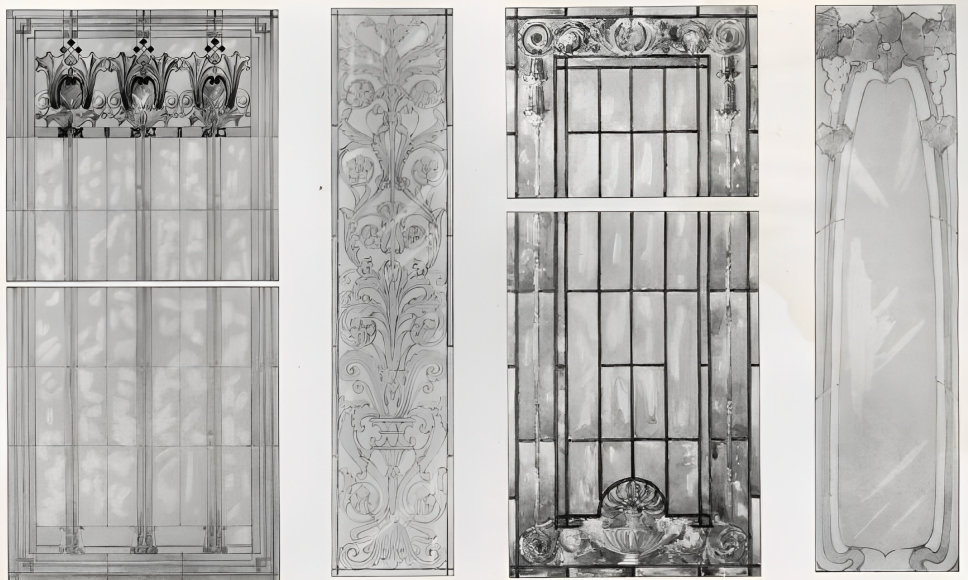
Some of Giannini and Hilgart's window designs

Giannini & Hilgart is a Chicago-based glass studio. It was founded in 1899 by Orlando Giannini (1860–1928), a Swiss-Italian sculptor from Ohio, and German-born glass cutter Frederick Hilgart (1867–1943). Giannini and Hilgart created stained glass windows and mosaics, often in the Art Nouveau style. Giannini left the firm in 1907 and it was passed down to Hilgart's son, Fred Hilgart. After his death, Giannini & Hilgart was given to Lubomyr Wandzura, an employee who had moved to the United States from Ukraine after World War II and worked at the firm as painter.
