= Edward J. Burling =

American architect

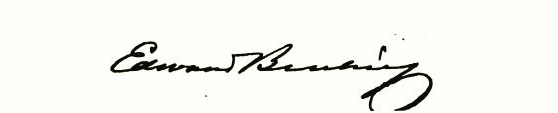
Burling's signature

Edward J. Burling (April 24, 1819, in Newburgh, New York – February 1892) was an American architect who designed buildings in Chicago in the 1840s through the 1890s.

== Personal life ==
Edward J. Burling was born April 24, 1819, to Nathaniel Burling (1778-1828) and Elizabeth (maiden name unknown) Burling (1798-1886) in Newburgh, New York, a town located along the Hudson River between New York City and Albany, New York. He was never formally trained nor completed his education, but began a carpentry apprenticeship as a teenager, heading up the design and construction of a few homes after having experience.

In 1843, Burling moved from Newburgh, New York to Chicago to start his career in Architecture. Burling was married to Eliza Burling and had six children together. He died in February 1892.

== Architecture ==
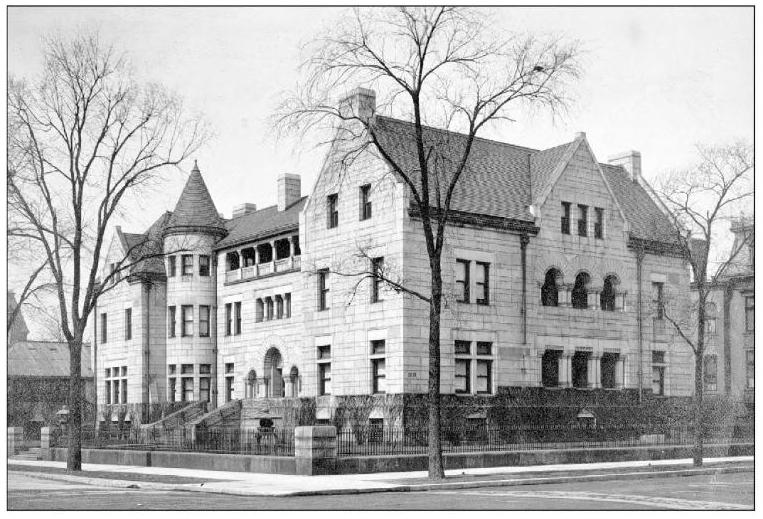
Higinbotham Country Club designed by Burling, c. 1890.

Burling’s first project was in 1845. He was hired to build a Greek Revival home for Eli B. Williams, one of Chicago’s earliest settlers and real estate developers. Burling's career first took off after this project: designing churches, government buildings, and grand homes.

Real Estate mogul William B. Ogden, who was Chicago’s first mayor in 1837, hired Burling to work for his firm, Ogden, Jones & Co., as general superintendent. Burling eventually split from Ogden's firm, forming a partnership with Frederick H. Baumann in 1852 and creating the firm Edward Burling & Co. in 1855. One record shows that Burling had, at one point, construction moving forward on one church, one residence, one public building, three hotels, and twelve commercial buildings.

Burling had many architectural works during these early years. Unfortunately for Burling’s architectural legacy, nearly all of his early work was consumed by the Great Fire in 1871. The fire practically wiped Chicago’s slate clean. Despite his work getting destroyed, his Tribune Building—the first supposedly fireproof building in the city—saw its iron beams melt into liquid rivers in the blasting heat, and its stone baked and crumbled to dust. Still, a stone-walled survivor of Burling’s early work stands next to the Driehaus Museum today: St. James Cathedral, which he built in 1857 and rebuilt in 1875.

Later in Burlings career, he created a firm with architect Dankmar Adler. They reconstructed four miles’ worth of streetscape in the single year after the fire, more than 100 buildings created in all. Some were rebuilds, including the second Tribune Building and Marine Bank Building—while others were new, important commissions, including the Chicago Post Office and Customs House and Methodist Church Block, a religious denomination with which Burling was affiliated.
