= Typewriter =

Mechanical device for typing characters

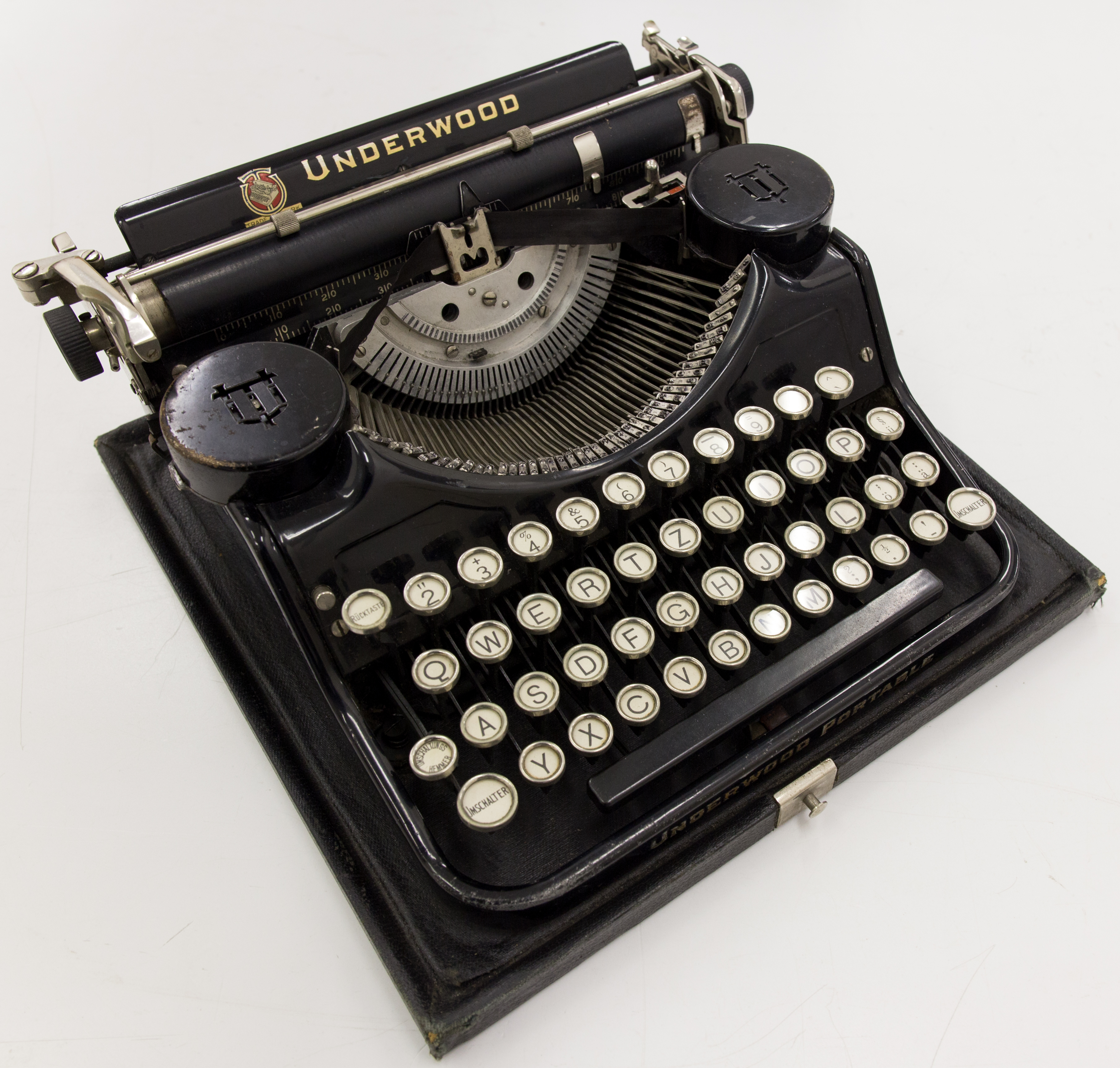
Mechanical typewriters, such as this 1930s Underwood, were long-time standards in government agencies, newsrooms, and offices.

This late 1960s Olivetti Valentine typewriter designed by Ettore Sottsass became a pop-culture icon.

A typewriter is a mechanical or electromechanical machine for typing characters. Typically, a typewriter has an array of keys, and each one causes a different single character to be produced on paper by striking an inked ribbon selectively against the paper with a type element. Thereby, the machine produces a legible written document composed of ink and paper. By the end of the 19th century, a person who used such a device was also referred to as a typist or a typewriter.

The first commercial typewriters were introduced in 1874, but did not become common in offices in the United States until after the mid-1880s. The typewriter quickly became an indispensable tool for practically all writing other than personal handwritten correspondence. It was widely used by professional writers, in offices, in business correspondence in private homes, and by students preparing written assignments.

The typewriter was an early accessibility tool, and its use for the blind accelerated its development.

Typewriters were a standard fixture in most offices up to the 1980s. After that, they began to be largely supplanted by personal computers running word processing software. Nevertheless, typewriters remain common in some parts of the world. For example, typewriters are still used in many Indian cities and towns, especially in roadside and legal offices, due to a lack of continuous, reliable electricity.

QWERTY, developed for typewriters in the 1870s, remains the de facto standard keyboard layout for English‑language computer keyboards. The original design intentions remain unclear. Similar typewriter keyboards, with layouts optimised for other languages and orthographies, emerged soon afterward and set respective standards.

== History ==
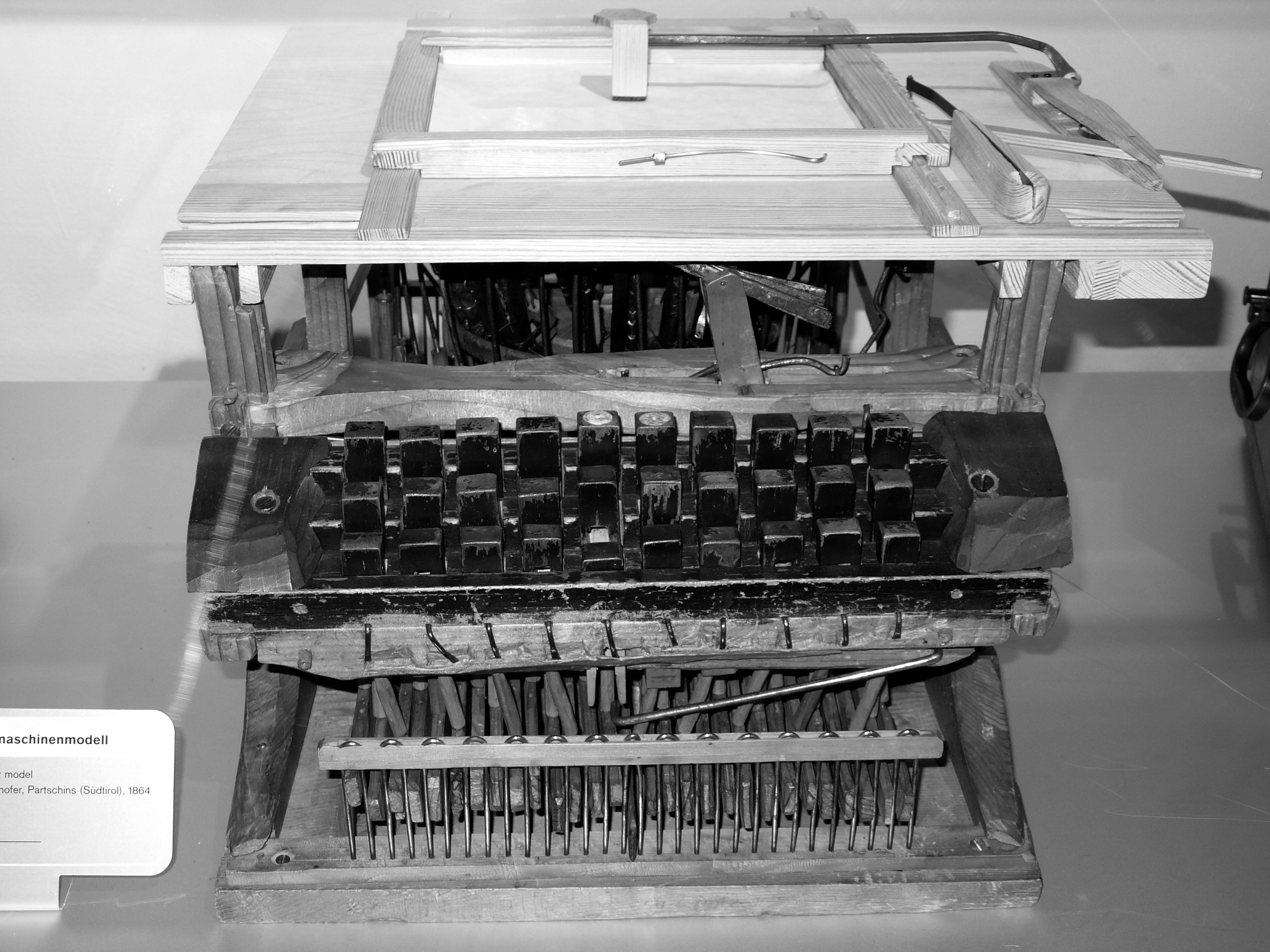
Peter Mitterhofer's typewriter prototype (1864)

Although many modern typewriters have one of several similar designs, their invention was incremental, developed by numerous inventors working independently or in competition with each other over a series of decades. As with the automobile, the telephone, and telegraph, several people contributed insights and inventions that eventually resulted in ever more commercially successful instruments. Historians have estimated that some form of the typewriter was invented 52 times as thinkers and tinkerers tried to come up with a workable design.

Some early typing instruments include:

- In 1575, an Italian printmaker, Francesco Rampazetto, invented the scrittura tattile, a machine to impress letters in papers.
- In 1714, Henry Mill obtained a patent in Great Britain for a machine that, from the patent, appears to have been similar to a typewriter. The patent shows that this machine was created: "[he] hath by his great study and paines & expence invented and brought to perfection an artificial machine or method for impressing or transcribing of letters, one after another, as in writing, whereby all writing whatsoever may be engrossed in paper or parchment so neat and exact as not to be distinguished from print; that the said machine or method may be of great use in settlements and public records, the impression being deeper and more lasting than any other writing, and not to be erased or counterfeited without manifest discovery."
- In 1802, Agostino Fantoni developed a particular typewriter to enable his blind sister to write.
- Between 1801 and 1808, Pellegrino Turri invented a typewriter for his blind friend Countess Carolina Fantoni da Fivizzano.
- In 1823, Pietro Conti da Cilavegna invented a new model of the typewriter, the tachigrafo, also known as tachitipo.
- In 1829, American William Austin Burt patented a machine called the "Typographer" which, in common with many other early machines, is listed as the "first typewriter". The London Science Museum describes it merely as "the first writing mechanism whose invention was documented", but even that claim may be excessive since Turri's invention pre-dates it.

By the mid-19th century, the increasing pace of business communication had created a need to mechanize the writing process. Stenographers and telegraphers could take down information at rates up to 130 words per minute, whereas a writer with a pen was limited to a maximum of 30 words per minute (the 1853 speed record).

From 1829 to 1870, many printing or typing machines were patented by inventors in Europe and America, but none went into commercial production.

- American Charles Thurber developed multiple patents, of which his first in 1843 was created as an aid to blind people, such as the 1845 Chirographer.
- In 1850, British inventor William Hughes invented the Typograph, which was displayed at the World's Fairs of 1851 and 1862. It allowed blind people to use typewriters because of its raised keys. It became a standard tool in British schools for the blind throughout the 1850s. Hughes also served as the first governor of Henshaw's Blind Asylum in Manchester, which was dedicated to training and paid employment for blind people.
- In 1855, the Italian Giuseppe Ravizza created a prototype typewriter called Cembalo scrivano o macchina da scrivere a tasti ("Scribe harpsichord, or machine for writing with keys"). It was an advanced machine that let the user see the writing as it was typed.
- In 1861, Father Francisco João de Azevedo, a Brazilian priest, made his typewriter with basic materials and tools, such as wood and knives. In that same year, the Brazilian emperor Pedro II, presented a gold medal to Father Azevedo for this invention. Many Brazilian people, as well as the Brazilian federal government recognize Fr. Azevedo as the inventor of the typewriter, a claim that has been the subject of some controversy.
- In 1865, John Pratt, of Centre, Alabama (US), built a machine called the Pterotype which appeared in an 1867 Scientific American article and inspired other inventors.
- Between 1864 and 1867, Peter Mitterhofer, a carpenter from South Tyrol (then part of Austria) developed several models and a fully functioning prototype typewriter in 1867.

=== Hansen Writing Ball ===
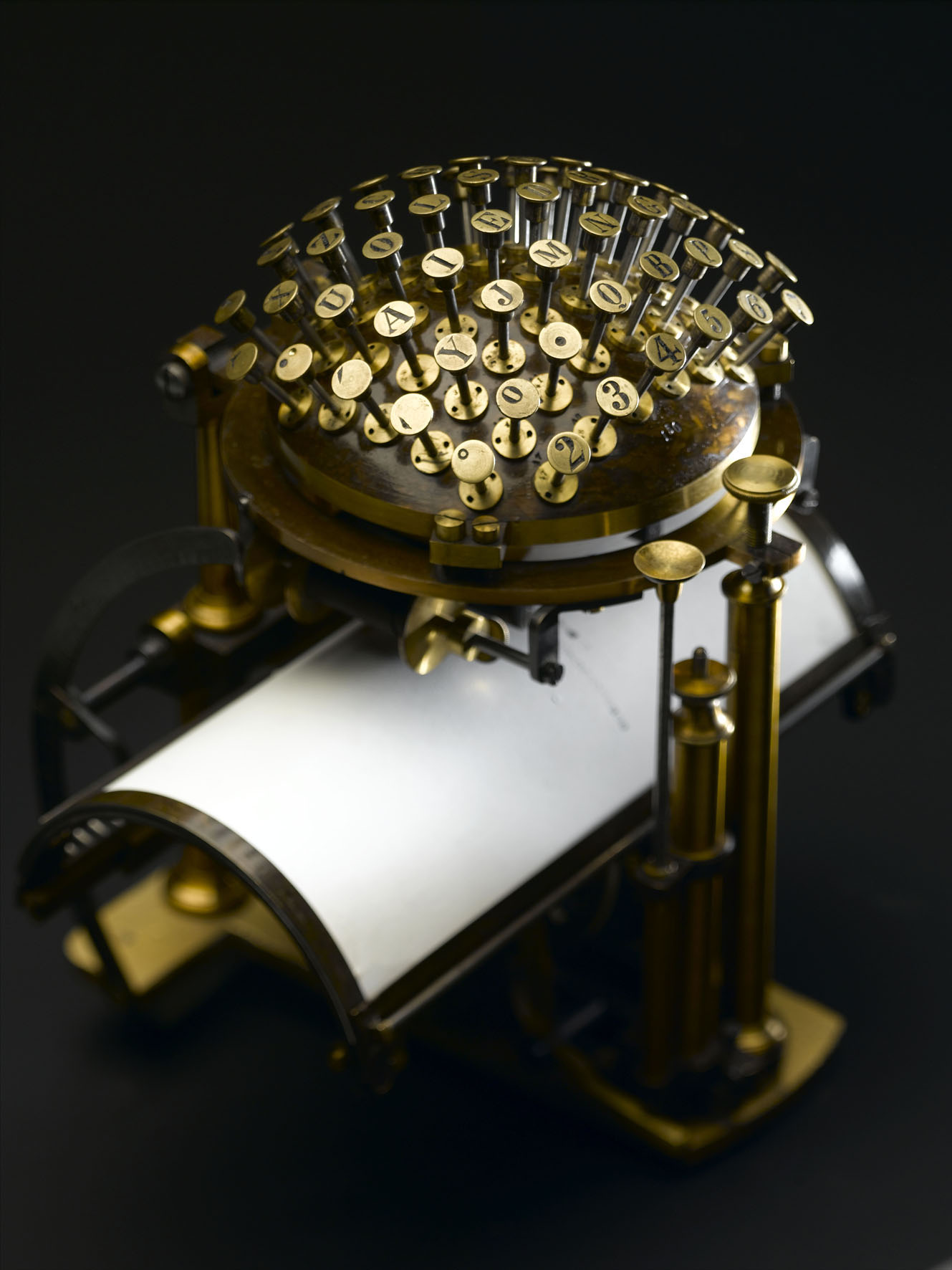
Hansen Writing Ball was the first typewriter manufactured commercially (1870).

In 1865, Rev. Rasmus Malling-Hansen of Denmark invented the Hansen Writing Ball, which went into commercial production in 1870 and was the first commercially sold typewriter. It was a success in Europe and was reported as being used in offices on the European continent as late as 1909.

Malling-Hansen used a solenoid escapement to return the carriage on some of his models, which makes him a candidate for the title of inventor of the first "electric" typewriter.

The Hansen Writing Ball was produced with only upper-case characters. The Writing Ball was a template for inventor Frank Haven Hall to create a derivative that would produce letter prints cheaper and faster.

Malling-Hansen developed his typewriter further through the 1870s and 1880s and made many improvements, but the writing head remained the same. On the first model of the writing ball from 1870, the paper was attached to a cylinder inside a wooden box. In 1874, the cylinder was replaced by a carriage, moving beneath the writing head. Then, in 1875, the well-known "tall model" was patented, which was the first of the writing balls that worked without electricity. Malling-Hansen attended the world exhibitions in Vienna in 1873 and Paris in 1878 and he received the first-prize for his invention at both exhibitions.

=== Sholes and Glidden typewriter ===
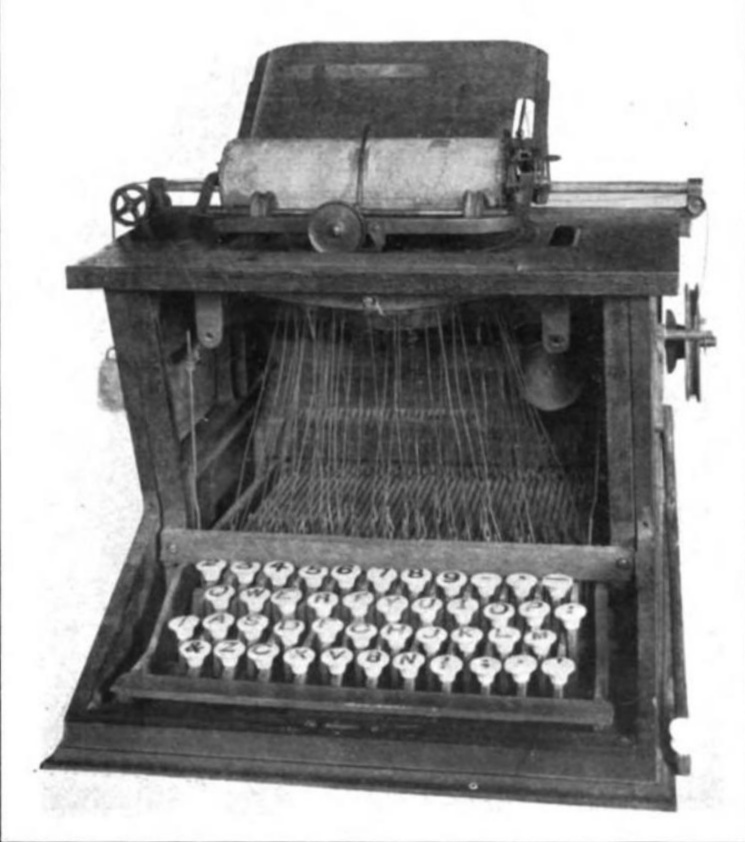
Prototype of the first commercially successful typewriter, the Sholes and Glidden (1873) – with the first QWERTY keyboard

The first typewriter to be commercially successful was patented in 1868 by Americans Christopher Latham Sholes, Frank Haven Hall, Carlos Glidden and Samuel W. Soule in Milwaukee, Wisconsin. The working prototype was made by clock-maker and machinist Matthias Schwalbach. Hall, Glidden and Soule sold their shares in the patent (US 79,265) to Sholes and James Densmore, who made an agreement with E. Remington and Sons (then famous as a manufacturer of sewing machines) to commercialize the machine as the Sholes and Glidden Type-Writer. This was the origin of the term typewriter.

Remington began production of its first typewriter on March 1, 1873, in Ilion, New York. It had a QWERTY keyboard layout, which, because of the machine's success, was slowly adopted by other typewriter manufacturers. As with most other early typewriters, because the typebars struck upwards, the typist could not see the characters as they were typed. This arrangement, retronymically known as understrike would eventually give way to so-called frontstrike mechanisms in later, competing machines.

=== Index typewriter ===
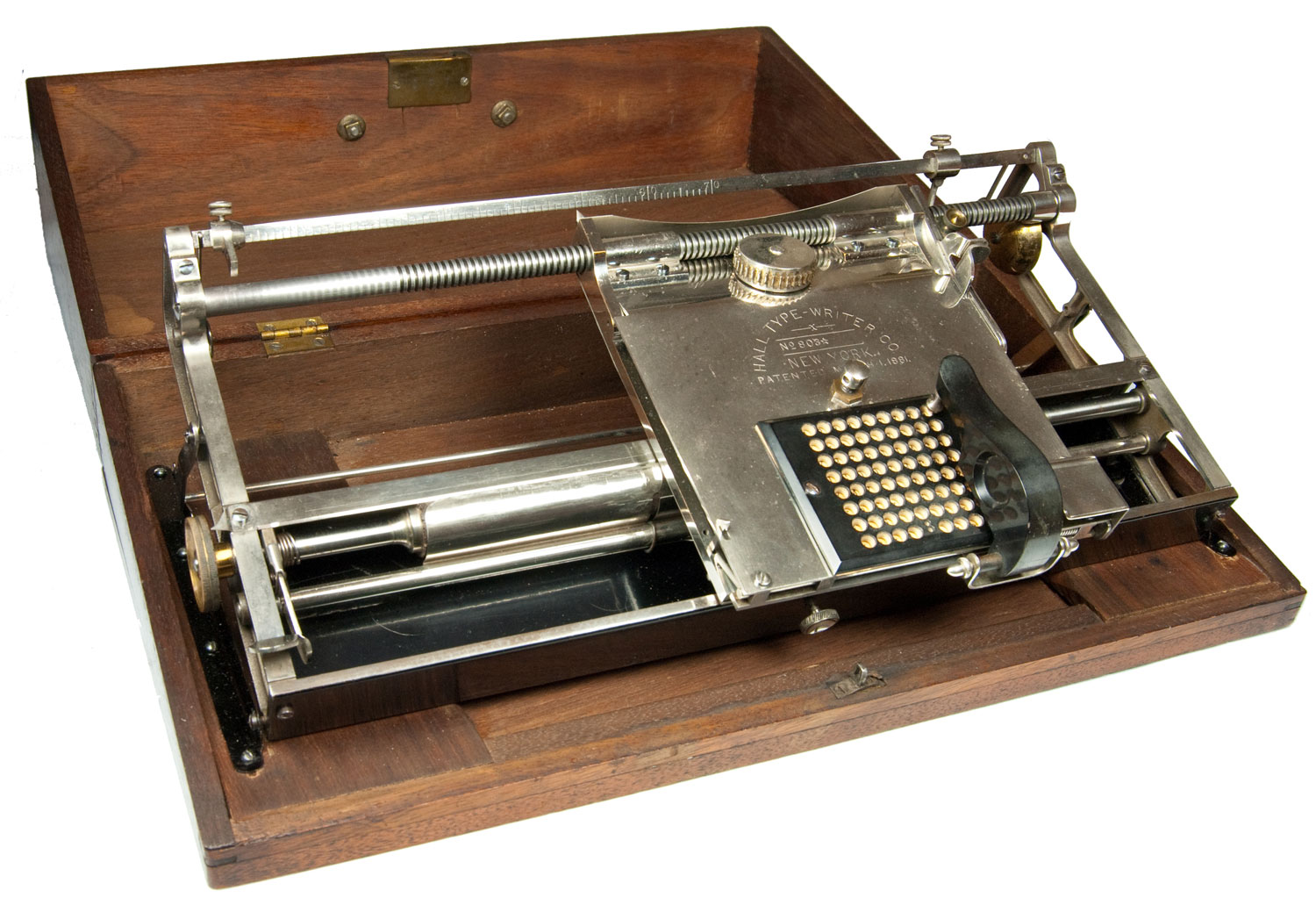
Hall 1 typewriter, 1881 – the first index typewriter

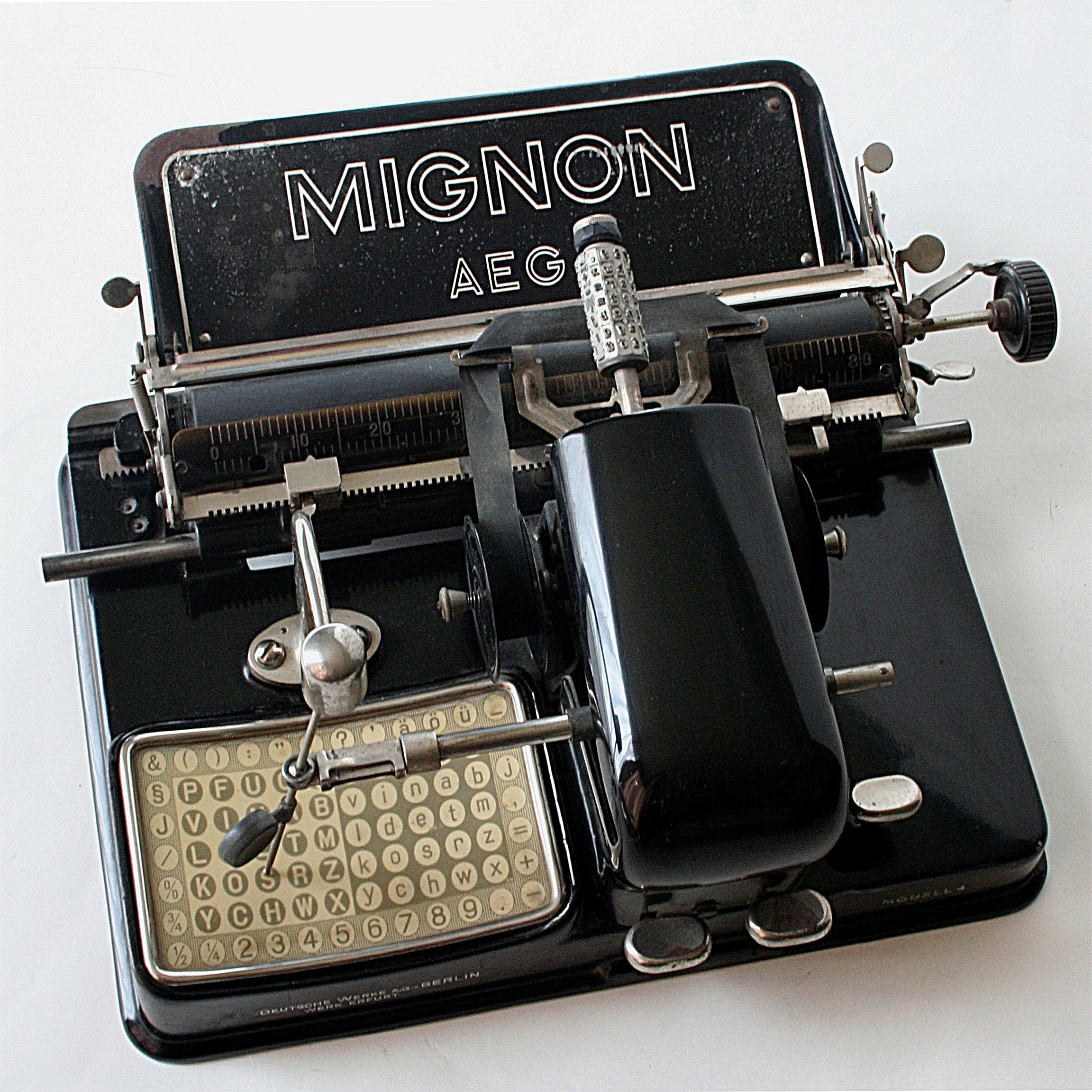
Mignon Model 4 – a portable index typewriter still manufactured in 1934

The index typewriter came into the market in the early 1880s. The index typewriter uses a pointer or stylus to choose a letter from an index. The pointer is mechanically linked so that the letter chosen could then be printed, most often by the activation of a lever.

The index typewriter was briefly popular in niche markets. Although they were slower than keyboard type machines, they were mechanically simpler and lighter. They were therefore marketed as being suitable for travellers and, because they could be produced more cheaply than keyboard machines, as budget machines for users who needed to produce small quantities of typed correspondence. For example, the Simplex Typewriter Company made index typewriters for 1/40 the price of a Remington typewriter.

The index typewriter's niche appeal however soon disappeared as, on the one hand new keyboard typewriters became lighter and more portable, and on the other refurbished second-hand machines began to become available. The last widely available western index machine was the Mignon typewriter produced by AEG which was produced until 1934. Considered one of the very best of the index typewriters, part of the Mignon's popularity was that it featured interchangeable indexes as well as type, fonts and character sets. This is something very few keyboard machines were capable of—and only at considerable added cost.

Although they were pushed out of the market in most of the world by keyboard machines, successful Japanese and Chinese typewriters are of the index type—albeit with a very much larger index and number of type elements.

Embossing tape label makers are the most common index typewriters today, and the most common typewriters of any type still being manufactured.

The platen was mounted on a carriage that moved horizontally to the left, automatically advancing the typing position, after each character was typed. The carriage-return lever at the far left was then pressed to the right to return the carriage to its starting position and rotating the platen to advance the paper vertically. A small bell was struck a few characters before the right hand margin was reached to warn the operator to complete the word and then use the carriage-return lever.

=== Other typewriters ===
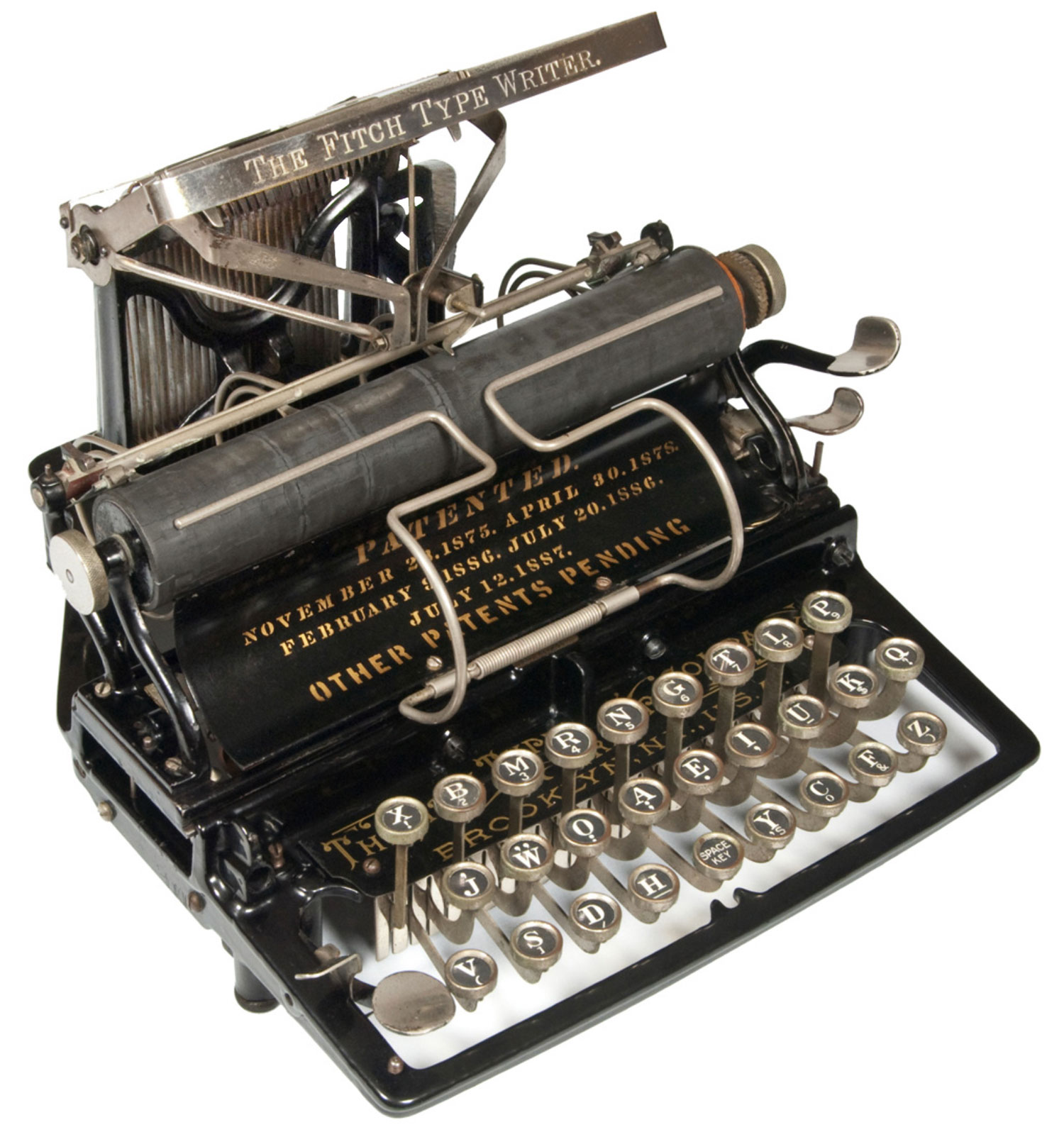
Fitch 1 typewriter, 1888

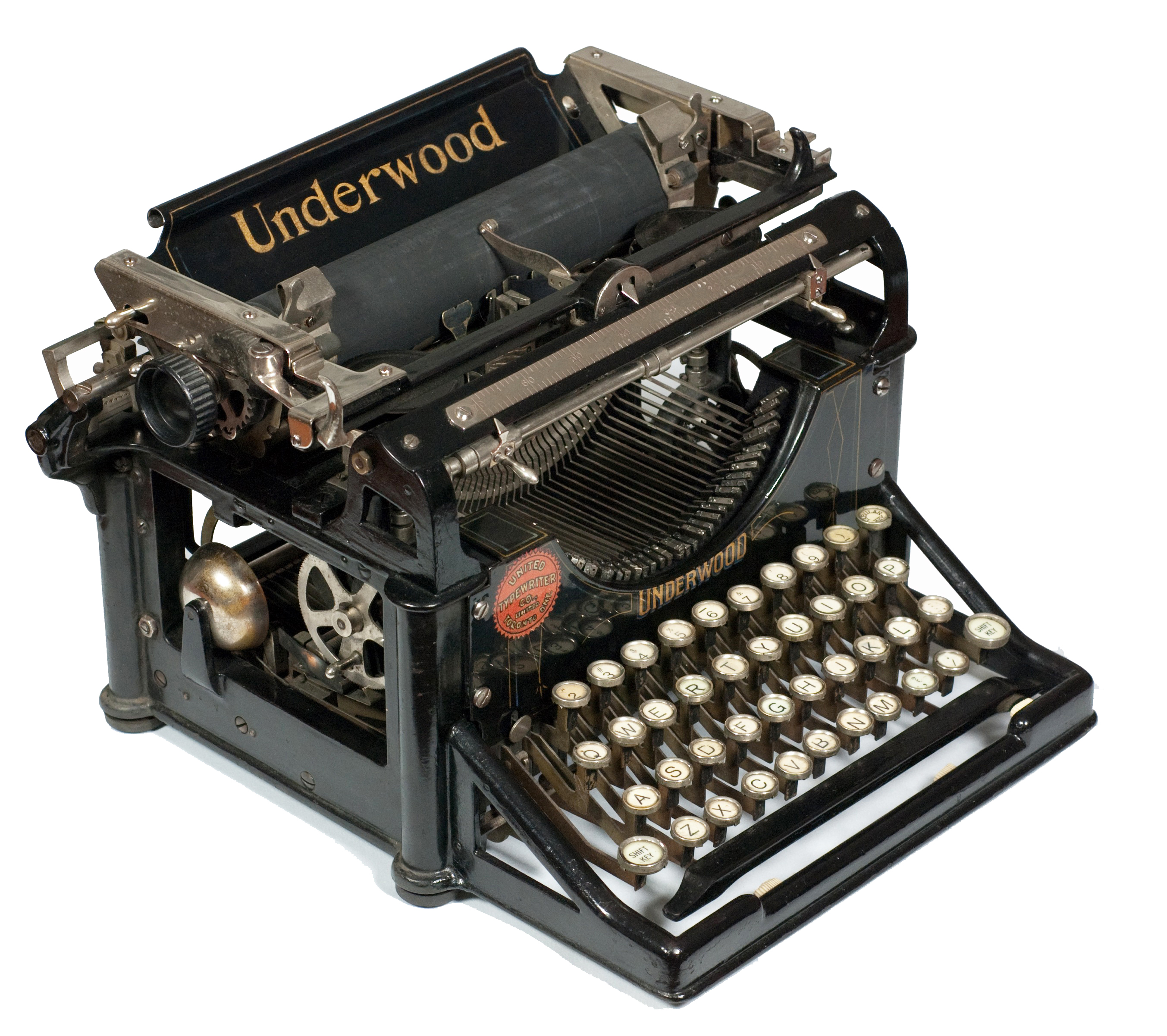
Underwood 1 typewriter, 1896 – the typewriter that would set the design standard for the new century, with four rows of keys, front strike visible and a single shift key. It also had a light and fast typing action.

- 1884 – Hammond Typewriter – made by Hammond Typewriter Company Limited, United States. Despite an unusual, curved keyboard (see pictures in Gallery and citation), the Hammond became popular because of its superior print quality and changeable typeface. Invented by James Hammond of Boston, Massachusetts in 1880, and commercially released in 1884. The type is carried on a pair of interchangeable rotating sectors, one controlled by each half of the keyboard. A small hammer pushes the paper against the ribbon and type sector to print each character. The mechanism was later adapted to give a straight QWERTY keyboard and proportional spacing.
  - This typewriter was adapted with a tactile interface and Braille output to allow the production and consumption of text by and for blind people. This adaptation was initiated in 1875 by Sir Francis Campbell, co-founder of the Royal National College for the Blind.
- 1888 – Fitch typewriter – made by the Fitch Typewriter Company, Brooklyn, N.Y. and later in the UK with a slightly different look. Operators of the early typewriters had to work "blind": the typed text emerged only after several lines had been completed or the carriage was lifted to look underneath at the page. The Fitch was one of the first machines to allow prompt correction of mistakes with its visible writing; it was said to be the second machine operating on the visible writing system. The typebars were positioned behind the paper and the writing area faced upwards so that the result could be seen instantly. A curved frame kept the emerging paper from obscuring the keyboard, but the Fitch was soon eclipsed by machines in which the paper could be fed more conveniently at the rear.
- 1893 – Gardner typewriter. This typewriter, patented by Mr J Gardner in 1893, was an attempt to reduce the size and cost. Although it prints 84 symbols, it has only 14 keys and two change-case keys. Several characters are indicated on each key and the character printed is determined by the position of the case keys, which choose one of six cases.
- 1896 – the "Underwood 1 typewriter, 10" Pica, No. 990". This was the first typewriter with a typing area fully visible to the typist until a key is struck. These features, copied by all subsequent typewriters, allowed the typist to see and if necessary correct the typing as it proceeded. The mechanism was developed in the US by Franz X. Wagner from about 1892 and taken up, in 1895, by John T. Underwood (1857–1937), a producer of office supplies.

=== Standardization ===
By about 1910, the "manual" or "mechanical" typewriter had reached a somewhat standardized design. There were minor variations from one manufacturer to another, but most typewriters followed the concept that each key was attached to a typebar that had the corresponding letter molded, in reverse, into its striking head. When a key was struck briskly and firmly, the typebar hit a ribbon (usually made of inked fabric), making a printed mark on the paper wrapped around a cylindrical platen.

The platen was mounted on a carriage that moved horizontally to the left, automatically advancing the typing position, after each character was typed. The carriage-return lever at the far left was then pressed to the right to return the carriage to its starting position and rotating the platen to advance the paper vertically. A small bell was struck a few characters before the right hand margin was reached to warn the operator to complete the word and then use the carriage-return lever. Typewriters for languages written right-to-left operate in the opposite direction.

By 1900, notable typewriter manufacturers included E. Remington and Sons, IBM, Godrej, Imperial Typewriter Company, Oliver Typewriter Company, Olivetti, Royal Typewriter Company, Smith Corona, Underwood Typewriter Company, Facit, Adler, and Olympia-Werke.

After the market had matured under the market dominance of large companies from Britain, Europe and the United States—but before the advent of daisywheel and electronic machines—the typewriter market faced strong competition from less expensive typewriters from Asia, including Brother Industries and Silver Seiko Ltd. of Japan.

==== Frontstriking ====
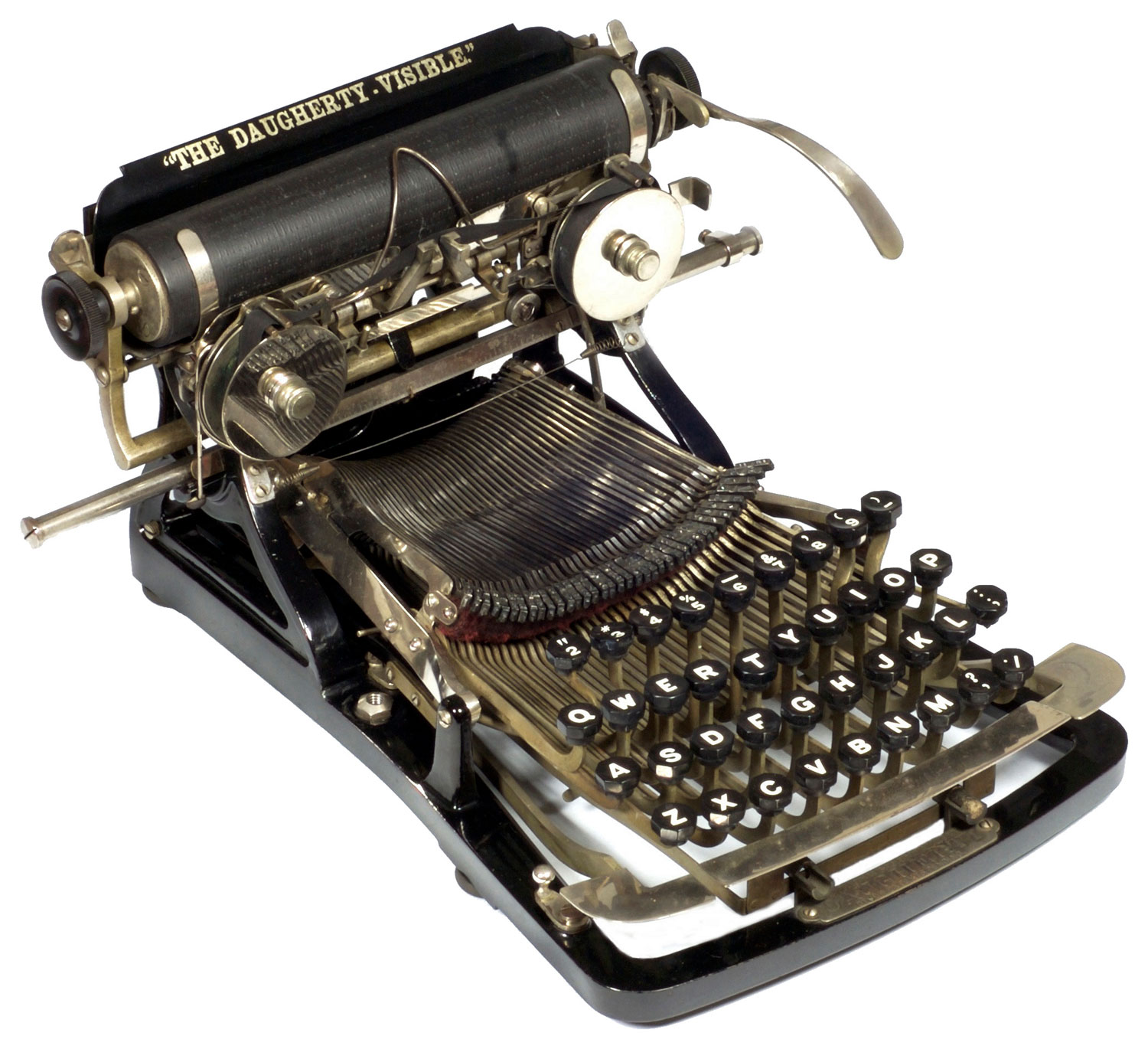
Daugherty typewriter, 1893

In most of the early typewriters, the typebars struck upward against the paper and pressed against the bottom of the platen (understrike), so the typist could not see the text as it was typed. What was typed was not visible until a carriage return caused it to scroll into view.

The difficulty with any other arrangement was ensuring the typebars fell back into place reliably when the key was released. This was eventually achieved with various ingenious mechanical designs and so-called "visible typewriters" which used frontstriking, in which the typebars struck forward against the front side of the platen, which became standard. One of the first front-strike typewriters was the Daugherty Visible, introduced in 1893.

==== Four-bank keyboard ====
The Daugherty Visible also introduced the four-bank keyboard, which also became standard, although the Underwood, which came out two years later, was the first major typewriter to support frontstriking and a four-bank keyboard.

==== Shift key ====
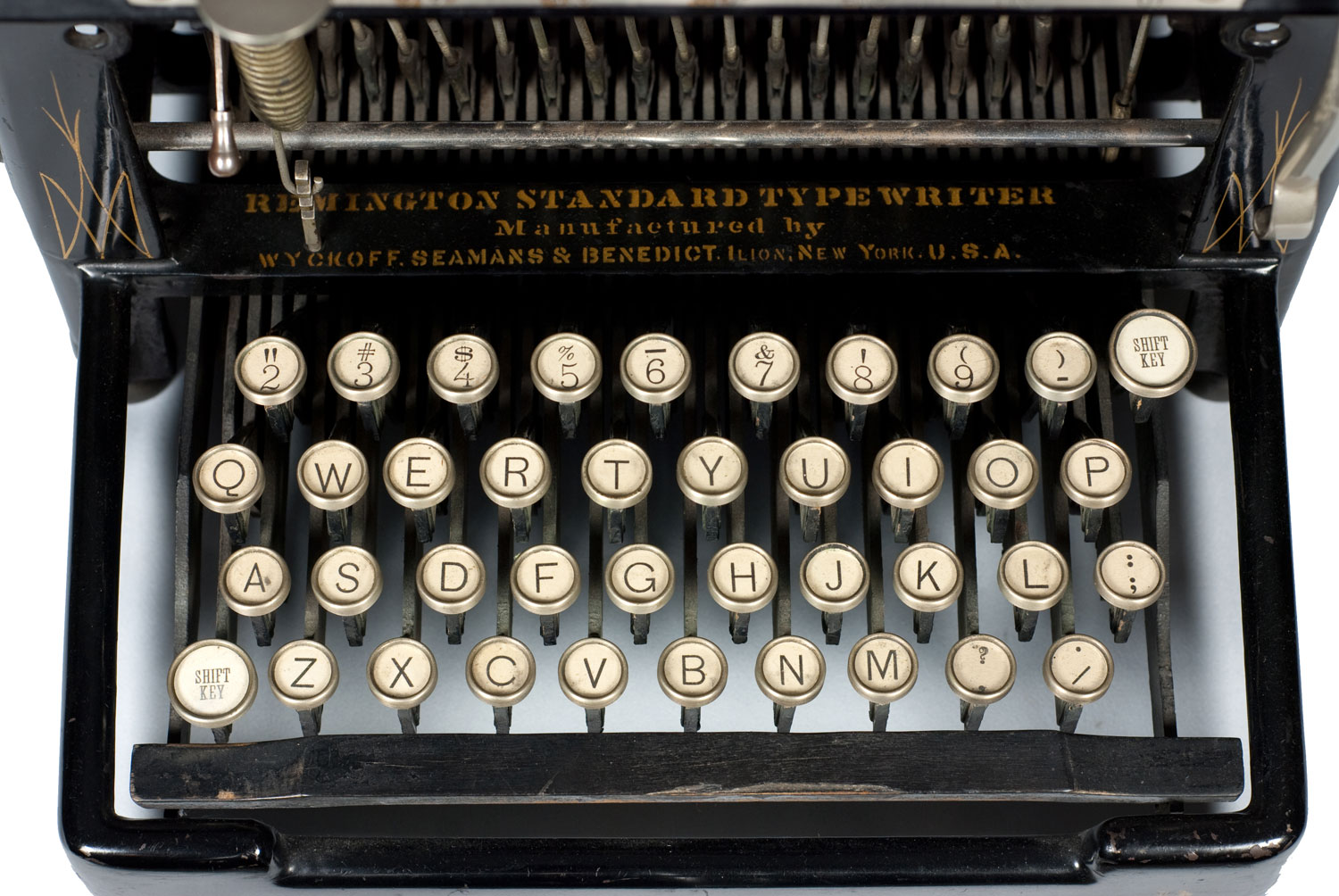
Remington#2 typewriter keyboard. Note the shift keys bottom-left and top-right. 1878.

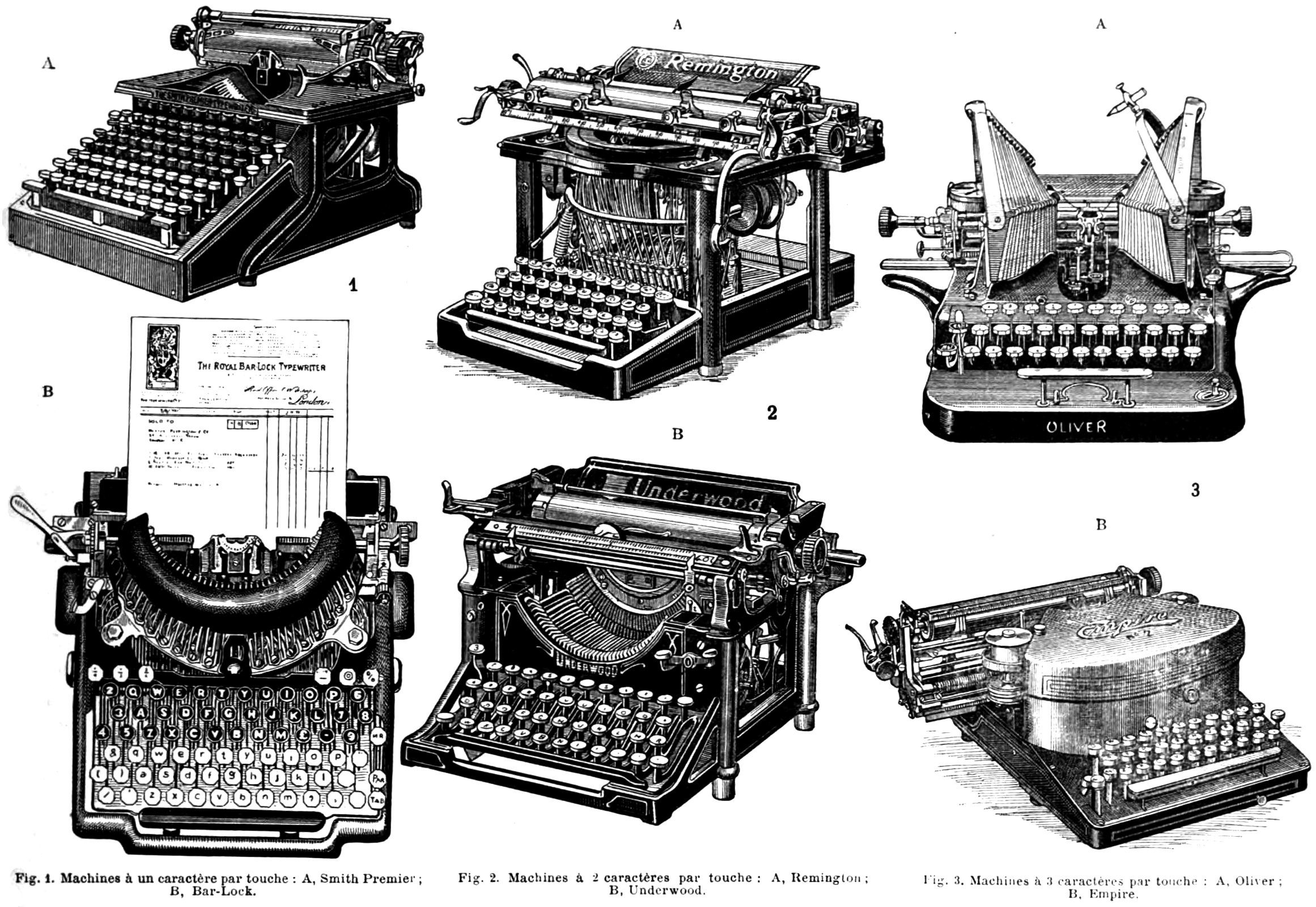
A 1911 comparison of then-current full-keyboard (left), single-shift (middle), and double-shift typewriters (right)

A significant innovation was the shift key, introduced with the Remington No. 2 in 1878. This key physically "shifted" either the basket of typebars, in which case the typewriter is described as "basket shift", or the paper-holding carriage, in which case the typewriter is described as "carriage shift". Either mechanism caused a different portion of the typebar to come in contact with the ribbon/platen.

The result is that each typebar could type two different characters, cutting the number of keys and typebars in half (and simplifying the internal mechanisms considerably). The obvious use for this was to allow letter keys to type both upper and lower case, but normally the number keys were also duplexed, allowing access to special symbols such as percent, %, and ampersand, &.

Before the shift key, typewriters had to have a separate key and typebar for upper-case letters; in essence, the typewriter had two full keyboards, one above the other. With the shift key, manufacturing costs (and therefore purchase price) were greatly reduced, and typist operation was simplified; both factors contributed greatly to mass adoption of the technology.

===== Three-bank typewriters =====
Certain models further reduced the number of keys and typebars by making each key perform three functions—each typebar could type three different characters. These little three-row machines were portable and could be used by journalists.

Such three-row machines were popular with WWI journalists because they were lighter and more compact than four-bank typewriters, while they could type just as fast and use just as many symbols. To include those symbols, three-row machines like the Bar-Let and the Corona No. 3 Typewriter had two distinct shift keys performing different functions, a "CAP" shift (for uppercase) and a "FIG" shift (for numbers and symbols). They were thus also known as double-shift typewriters.

Teletypewriters also often used a three-row typewriter keyboard, which looked superficially similar in that it also had two shift keys, "FIGS" (figures) and "LTRS" (letters). However, these Murray code-based machines generally did not allow each key to perform three functions and were a different technology from double-shift typewriters. (Note: Unlike shift keys on double-shift typewriters, teletypewriter shift keys were stateful—like Shift Lock. Typing or transmitting FIGS once shifted all following characters to "figure shift", until LTRS shifted the code back to "letter shift". Hence those two shift keys did not allow teletypewriters to include lower- as well as upper-case characters. A further feature finally allowing that only arrived as a 1988 extension to the Murray-based Alphabet 2 code, close to that technology's obsolescence.)

==== Tab key ====
To facilitate typewriter use in business settings, a tab (tabulator) key was added in the late 19th century. Before using the key, the operator had to set mechanical "tab stops" (pre-designated locations to which the carriage would advance when the tab key was pressed). This facilitated the typing of columns of numbers, freeing the operator from the need to manually position the carriage. The first models had one tab stop and one tab key; later ones allowed as many stops as desired, and sometimes had multiple tab keys, each of which moved the carriage a different number of spaces ahead of the decimal point (the tab stop), to facilitate the typing of columns with numbers of different length ($1.00, $10.00, $100.00, etc.) such that the decimal points were vertically aligned. Typically, tab stops could be set by a key-set tabulator control (either by a lever or keys on the keyboard—usually labelled with "+" or "-", or "set" and "clear") or moveable tab stops at the back of the machine, similar to margin stops.

==== Dead keys ====
Languages such as French, Spanish, and German required diacritics, special signs attached to or on top of the base letter: for example, a combination of the acute accent ´ plus e produced é; ~ plus n produced ñ. In metal typesetting, ⟨é⟩, ⟨ñ⟩, and others were separate sorts. With mechanical typewriters, the number of whose characters (sorts) was constrained by the physical limits of the machine, the number of keys required was reduced by the use of dead keys. Diacritics such as ´ (acute accent) would be assigned to a dead key, which did not move the platen forward, permitting another character to be imprinted at the same location; thus a single dead key such as the acute accent could be combined with a,e,i,o and u to produce á,é,í,ó and ú, reducing the number of sorts needed from 5 to 1. The typebars of "normal" characters struck a rod as they moved the metal character desired toward the ribbon and platen, and each rod depression moved the platen forward the width of one character. Dead keys had a typebar shaped so as not to strike the rod.

==== Character sizes ====
In English-speaking countries, ordinary typewriters printing fixed-width characters were standardized to print six horizontal lines per vertical inch, and had either of two variants of character width, one called pica for ten characters per horizontal inch and the other elite, for twelve. (This usage of the word pica differs from that used in printing and desktop publishing, where a pica is a linear unit (usually 1/6 of an inch) that may be used for any measurement, typically for the height of a typeface.)

==== Color ====
Some ribbons were inked in black and red stripes, each being half the width and running the entire length of the ribbon. A lever on most machines allowed switching between colors, which was useful for bookkeeping entries where negative amounts were highlighted in red. The red color was also used on some selected characters in running text, for emphasis. When a typewriter had this facility, it could still be fitted with a solid black ribbon; the lever was then used to switch to fresh ribbon when the first stripe ran out of ink. Some typewriters also had a third position which stopped the ribbon being struck at all. This enabled the keys to hit the paper unobstructed, and was used for cutting stencils for stencil duplicators (aka mimeograph machines).

==== "Noiseless" designs ====
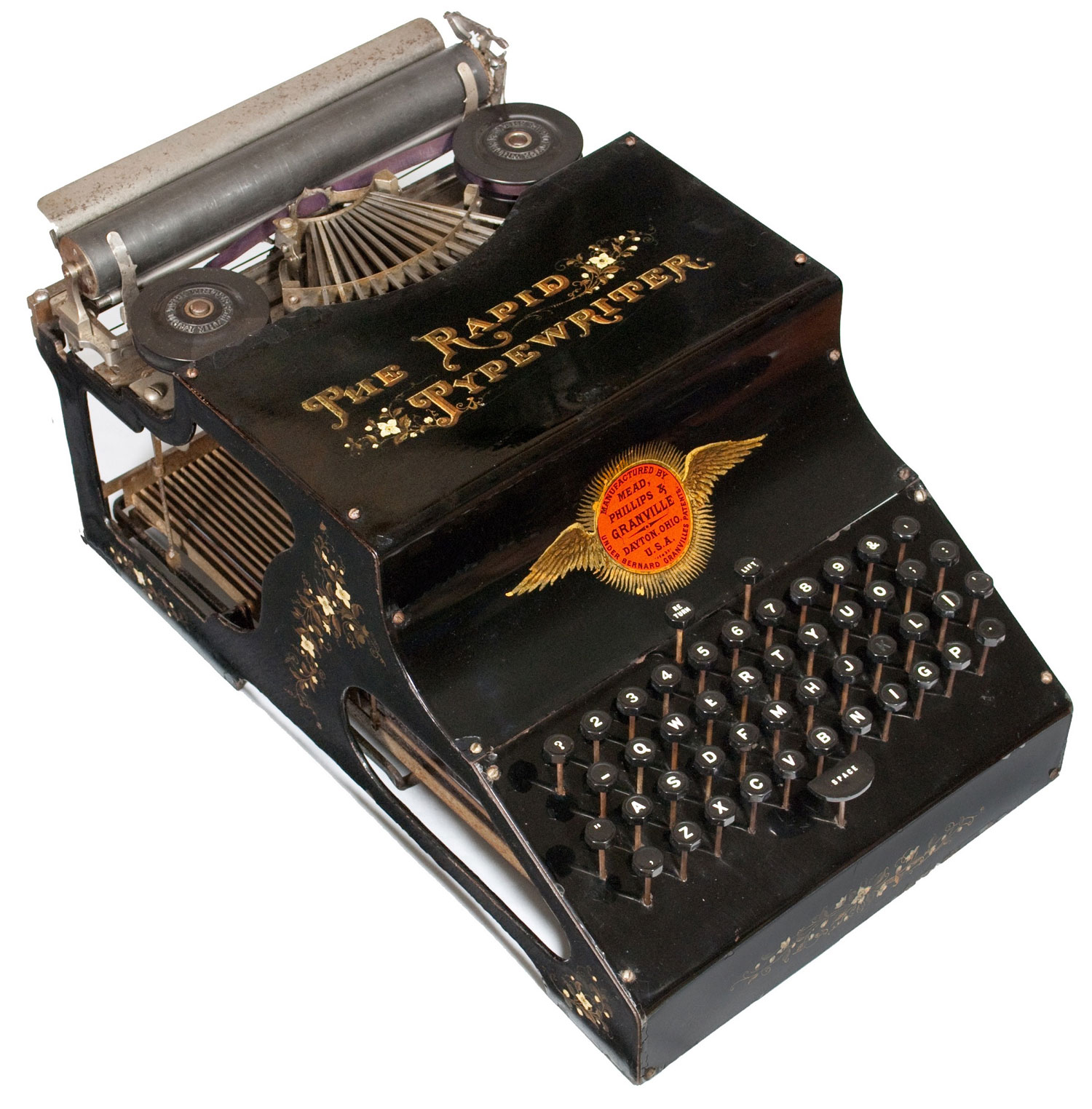
Rapid typewriter, 1890

The first typewriter to have the sliding type bars (laid out horizontally like a fan) that enable a typewriter to be "noiseless" was the American made Rapid which appeared briefly on the market in 1890. The Rapid also had the remarkable ability for the typist to have entire control of the carriage by manipulation of the keyboard alone. The two keys that achieve this are positioned at the top of the keyboard (seen in the detail image below). They are a "Lift" key that advances the paper, on the platen, to the next line and a "Return" key that causes the carriage to automatically swing back to the right, ready for one to type the new line. So an entire page could be typed without one's hands leaving the keyboard.

In the early part of the 20th century, a typewriter was marketed under the name Noiseless and advertised as "silent". It was developed by Wellington Parker Kidder and the first model was marketed by the Noiseless Typewriter Company in 1917. Noiseless portables sold well in the 1930s and 1940s, and noiseless standards continued to be manufactured until the 1960s.

In a conventional typewriter the type bar reaches the end of its travel simply by striking the ribbon and paper. The Noiseless, developed by Kidder, has a complex lever mechanism that decelerates the type bar mechanically before pressing it against the ribbon and paper in an attempt to dampen the noise.

=== Electric designs ===
Although electric typewriters would not achieve widespread popularity until nearly a century later, the basic groundwork for the electric typewriter was laid by the Universal Stock Ticker, invented by Thomas Edison in 1870. This device remotely printed letters and numbers on a stream of paper tape from input generated by a specially designed typewriter at the other end of a telegraph line.

==== Early electric models ====
Some electric typewriters were patented in the 19th century, but the first machine known to be produced in series is the Cahill of 1900.

Another electric typewriter was produced by the Blickensderfer Manufacturing Company, of Stamford, Connecticut, in 1902. Like the manual Blickensderfer typewriters, it used a cylindrical typewheel rather than individual typebars. The machine was produced in several variants but apparently not a commercial success, having come to market ahead of its time, before ubiquitous electrification.

The next step in the development of the electric typewriter came in 1910, when Charles and Howard Krum filed a patent for the first practical teletypewriter. The Krums' machine, named the Morkrum Printing Telegraph, used a typewheel rather than individual typebars. This machine was used for the first commercial teletypewriter system on Postal Telegraph Company lines between Boston and New York City in 1910.

James Fields Smathers of Kansas City invented what is considered the first practical power-operated typewriter in 1914. In 1920, after returning from Army service, he produced a successful model and in 1923 turned it over to the Northeast Electric Company of Rochester for development. Northeast was interested in finding new markets for their electric motors and developed Smathers's design so that it could be marketed to typewriter manufacturers, and from 1925 Remington Electric typewriters were produced powered by Northeast's motors.

After some 2,500 electric typewriters had been produced, Northeast asked Remington for a firm contract for the next batch. However, Remington was engaged in merger talks, which would eventually result in the creation of Remington Rand and no executives were willing to commit to a firm order. Northeast instead decided to enter the typewriter business for itself, and in 1929 produced the first Electromatic Typewriter.

In 1928, Delco, a division of General Motors, purchased Northeast Electric, and the typewriter business was spun off as Electromatic Typewriters, Inc. In 1933, Electromatic was acquired by IBM, which then spent $1 million on a redesign of the Electromatic Typewriter, launching the IBM Electric Typewriter Model 01.

In 1931, an electric typewriter was introduced by Varityper Corporation. It was called the Varityper, because a narrow cylinder-like wheel could be replaced to change the typeface.

In 1941, IBM announced the Electromatic Model 04 electric typewriter, featuring the revolutionary concept of proportional spacing. By assigning varied rather than uniform spacing to different sized characters, the Type 4 recreated the appearance of a typeset page, an effect that was further enhanced by including the 1937 innovation of carbon-film ribbons that produced clearer, sharper words on the page.

==== IBM Selectric ====
IBM Selectric II (dual Latin/Hebrew typeball and keyboard)

IBM introduced the IBM Selectric typewriter in 1961, which replaced the typebars with a spherical element (or typeball) slightly smaller than a golf ball, with reverse-image letters molded into its surface. The Selectric used a system of latches, metal tapes, and pulleys driven by an electric motor to rotate the ball into the correct position and then strike it against the ribbon and platen. The typeball moved laterally in front of the paper, instead of the previous designs using a platen-carrying carriage moving the paper across a stationary print position.

Due to the physical similarity, the typeball was sometimes referred to as a "golfball". The typeball design had many advantages, especially the elimination of "jams" (when more than one key was struck at once and the typebars became entangled) and in the ability to change the typeball, allowing multiple typefaces to be used in a single document.

The IBM Selectric became a commercial success, dominating the office typewriter market for at least two decades. IBM also gained an advantage by marketing more heavily to schools than did Remington, with the idea that students who learned to type on a Selectric would later choose IBM typewriters over the competition in the workplace as businesses replaced their old manual models.

Later models of IBM Executives and Selectrics replaced inked fabric ribbons with "carbon film" ribbons that had a dry black or colored powder on a clear plastic tape. These could be used only once, but later models used a cartridge that was simple to replace. A side effect of this technology was that the text typed on the machine could be easily read from the used ribbon, raising issues where the machines were used for preparing classified documents (ribbons had to be accounted for to ensure that typists did not carry them from the facility).

A variation known as "Correcting Selectrics" introduced a correction feature, later imitated by competing machines, where a sticky tape in front of the carbon film ribbon could remove the black-powdered image of a typed character, eliminating the need for little bottles of white dab-on correction fluid and for hard erasers that could tear the paper. These machines also introduced selectable "pitch" so that the typewriter could be switched between pica type (10 characters per inch) and elite type (12 per inch), even within one document. Even so, all Selectrics were monospaced—each character and letterspace was allotted the same width on the page, from a capital "W" to a period. IBM did produce a successful typebar-based machine with five levels of proportional spacing, called the IBM Executive.

The only fully electromechanical Selectric Typewriter with fully proportional spacing and which used a Selectric type element was the expensive Selectric Composer, which was capable of right-margin justification (typing each line twice was required, once to calculate and again to print) and was considered a typesetting machine rather than a typewriter. Composer typeballs physically resembled those of the Selectric typewriter but were not interchangeable.

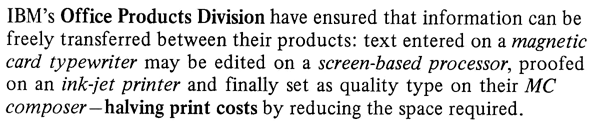
Composer output showing Roman, Bold, and Italic typefaces were available by changing the type ball.

In addition to its electronic successors, the Magnetic Tape Selectric Composer (MT/SC), the Mag Card Selectric Composer, and the Electronic Selectric Composer, IBM also made electronic typewriters with proportional spacing using the Selectric element that were considered typewriters or word processors instead of typesetting machines.

The first of these was the relatively obscure Mag Card Executive, which used 88-character elements. Later, some of the same typestyles used for it were used on the 96-character elements used on the IBM Electronic Typewriter 50 and the later models 65 and 85.

By 1970, as offset printing began to replace letterpress printing, the Composer would be adapted as the output unit for a phototypesetting system. The system included a computer-driven input station to capture the key strokes on magnetic tape and insert the operator's format commands, and a Composer unit to read the tape and produce the formatted text for photo reproduction.

The IBM 2741 terminal was a popular example of a Selectric-based computer terminal, and similar mechanisms were employed as the console devices for many IBM System/360 computers. These mechanisms used "ruggedized" designs compared to those in standard office typewriters.

==== Later electric models ====
Smith-Corona Prestige Auto 12 being tapped
A recording of the sound of typing on a Smith-Corona electric typewriter.

Some of IBM's advances were later adopted in less expensive machines from competitors. For example, Smith-Corona electric typewriters introduced in 1973 switched to interchangeable Coronamatic (SCM-patented) ribbon cartridges.

==== Electronic typewriters ====
The final major development of the typewriter was the electronic typewriter. Most of these replaced the typeball with a plastic or metal daisy wheel mechanism (a disk with the letters molded on the outside edge of the "petals"), or a thermal print head. The daisy wheel concept first emerged in printers developed by Diablo Systems in the 1970s. The first electronic daisywheel typewriter marketed in the world (in 1976) is the Olivetti Tes 501, and subsequently in 1978, the Olivetti ET101 (with function display) and Olivetti TES 401 (with text display and floppy disk for memory storage). This has allowed Olivetti to maintain the world record in the design of electronic typewriters, proposing increasingly advanced and performing models in the following years.

Unlike the Selectrics and earlier models, these really were "electronic" and relied on integrated circuits and electromechanical components. These typewriters were sometimes called display typewriters, dedicated word processors or word-processing typewriters, although the latter term was also frequently applied to less sophisticated machines that featured only a tiny, sometimes just single-row display. Sophisticated models were also called word processors, although today that term almost always denotes a type of software program. Manufacturers of such machines included Olivetti (TES501, first totally electronic Olivetti word processor with daisywheel and floppy disk in 1976; TES621 in 1979, etc.), Brother (Brother WP1 and WP500, etc., where WP stood for word processor), Canon (Canon Cat), Smith-Corona (PWP, i.e. Personal Word Processor line) and Philips/Magnavox (VideoWriter).

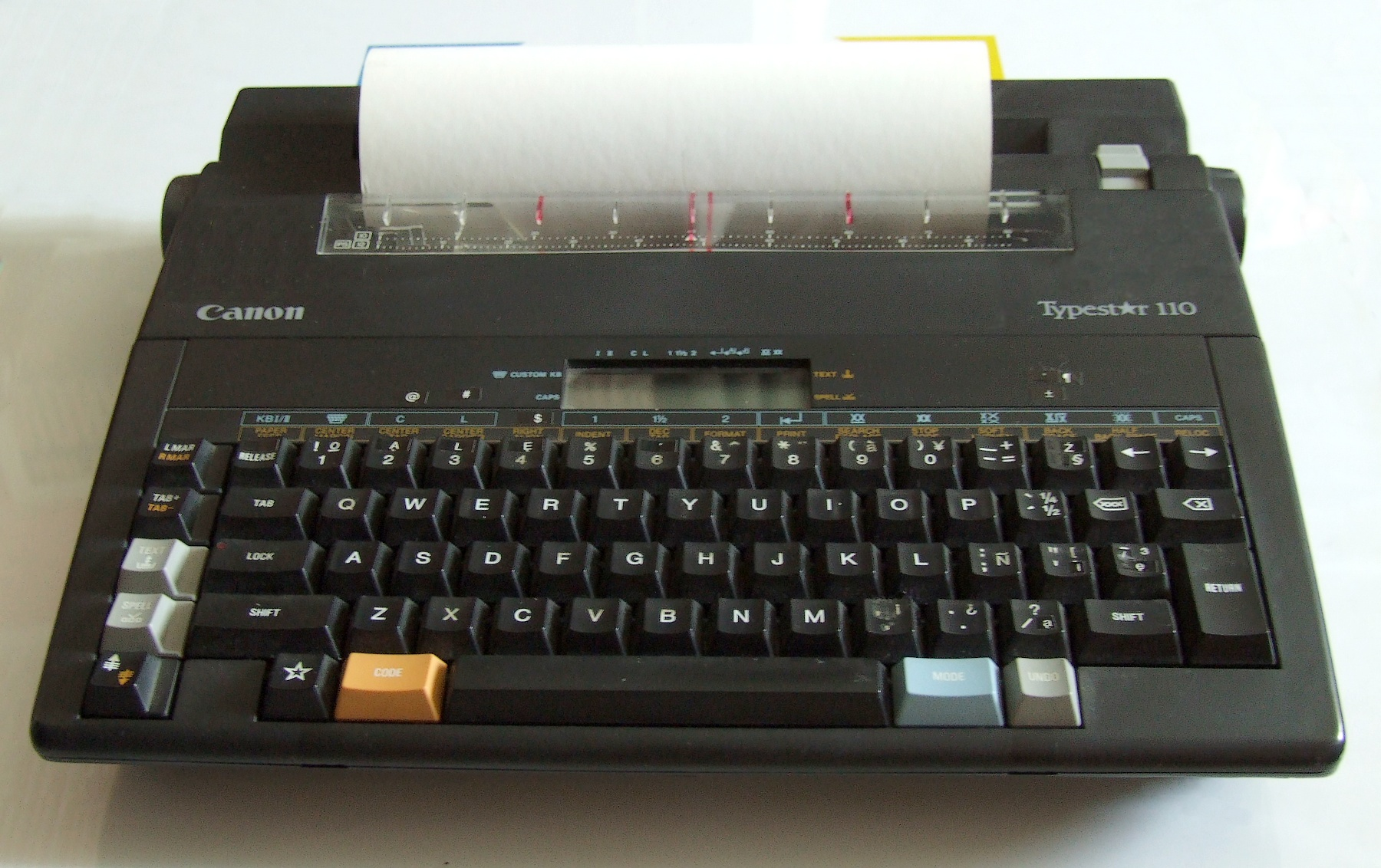
Electronic typewriter – the final stage in typewriter development. A 1989 Canon Typestar 110.

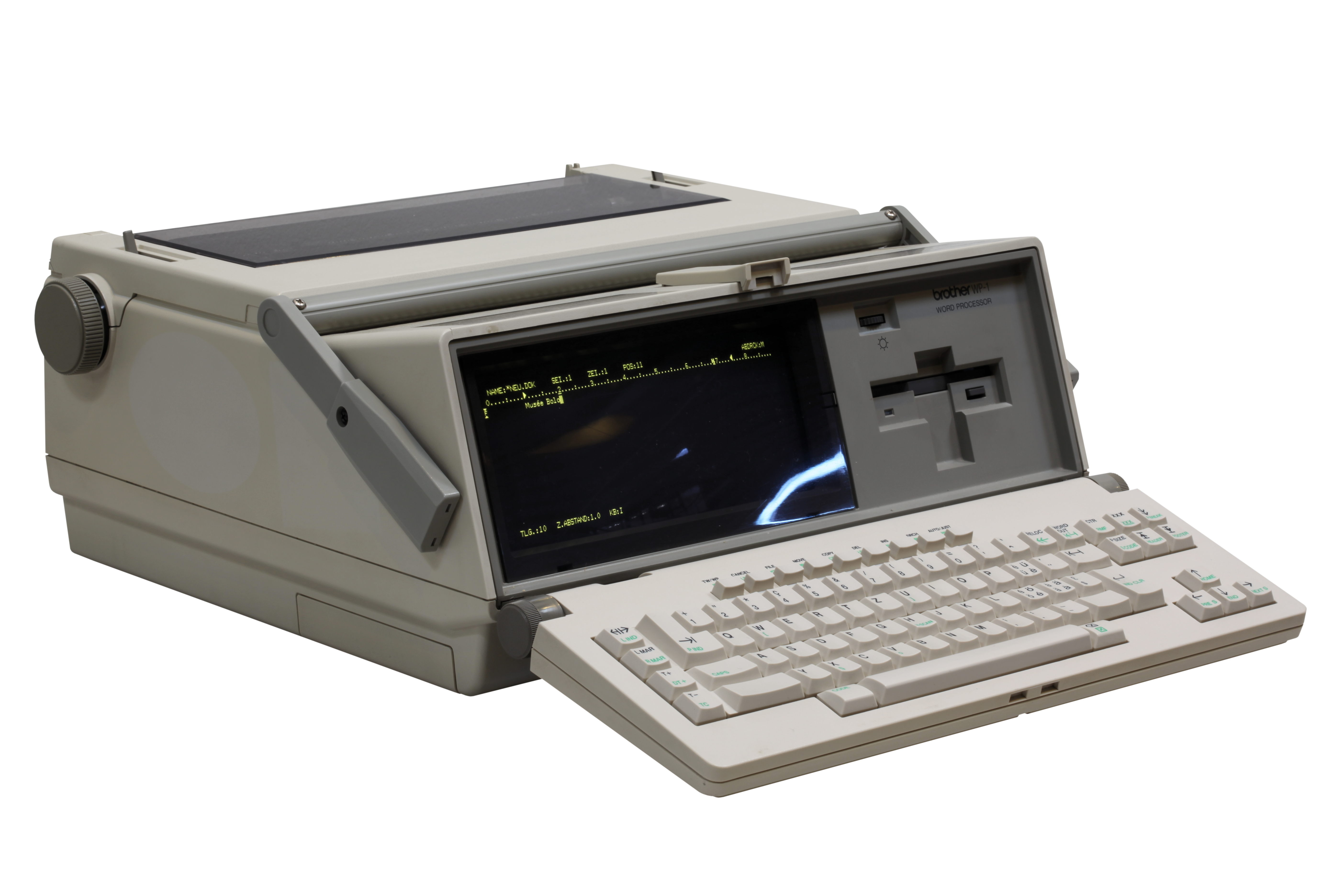
The Brother WP1, an electronic typewriter complete with a small screen and a floppy disk reader

=== Decline ===
The pace of change was so rapid that it was common for clerical staff to have to learn several new systems, one after the other, in just a few years. While such rapid change is commonplace today, and is taken for granted, this was not always so; in fact, typewriting technology changed very little in its first 80 or 90 years.

Due to falling sales, IBM sold its typewriter division in 1991 to the newly formed Lexmark, completely exiting from a market it once dominated.

The increasing dominance of personal computers, desktop publishing, the introduction of low-cost, truly high-quality laser and inkjet printer technologies, and the pervasive use of web publishing, email, text messaging, and other electronic communication techniques have largely replaced typewriters in the United States. Still, as of 2009, typewriters continued to be used by a number of government agencies and other institutions in the US, where they are primarily used to fill preprinted forms. According to a Boston typewriter repairman quoted by The Boston Globe, "Every maternity ward has a typewriter, as well as funeral homes."

A rather specialized market for typewriters exists due to the regulations of many correctional systems in the US, where prisoners are prohibited from having computers or telecommunication equipment, but are allowed to own typewriters. The Swintec corporation (headquartered in Moonachie, New Jersey), which, as of 2011, still produced typewriters at its overseas factories (in Japan, Indonesia, and/or Malaysia), manufactures a variety of typewriters for use in prisons, made of clear plastic (to make it harder for prisoners to hide prohibited items inside it). As of 2011, the company had contracts with prisons in 43 US states.

In April 2011, Godrej and Boyce, a Mumbai-based manufacturer of mechanical typewriters, closed its doors, leading to a flurry of news reports that the "world's last typewriter factory" had shut down. The reports were quickly contested, with opinions settling to agree that it was indeed the world's last producer of standard manual typewriters.

In November 2012, Brother's UK factory manufactured what it claimed to be the last typewriter ever made in the UK; the typewriter was donated to the London Science Museum.

Russian typewriters use Cyrillic, which has made the ongoing Azerbaijani reconversion from Cyrillic to Latin alphabet more difficult. In 1997, the government of Turkey offered to donate western typewriters to the Republic of Azerbaijan in exchange for more zealous and exclusive promotion of the Latin alphabet for the Azerbaijani language; this offer, however, was declined.

In Latin America and Africa, mechanical typewriters are still common because they can be used without electrical power. In Latin America, the typewriters used are most often Brazilian models; in 2012, Brazil was continuing to produce mechanical (Facit) and electronic (Olivetti) typewriters.

The early 21st century saw revival of interest in typewriters among certain subcultures, including makers, steampunks, hipsters, and street poets. They also remained in use for filling out forms, and retained interest for some novelists who preferred writing without the distractions of a personal computer.

== Correction technologies ==
According to the standards taught in secretarial schools in the mid-20th century, a business letter was supposed to have no mistakes and no visible corrections.

=== Typewriter erasers ===
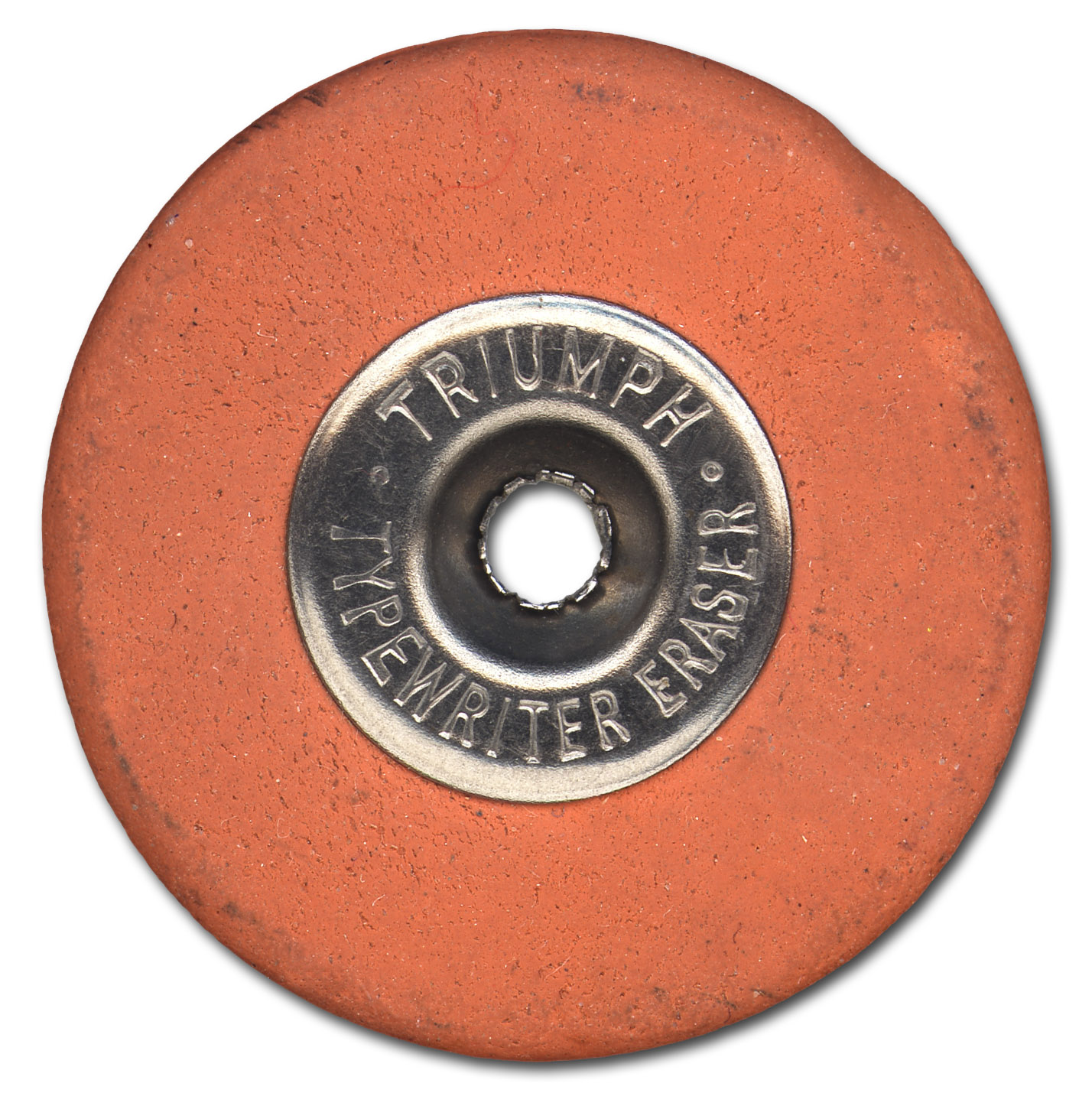
Triumph typewriter eraser (1960)

The traditional correction method involved the use of a special typewriter eraser made of hard rubber that contained an abrasive material. Some were thin, flat disks, pink or gray, approximately 2 inches (51 mm) in diameter by 1/8 inch (3.2 mm) thick, with a brush attached from the center, while others looked like pink pencils, with a sharpenable eraser at the "lead" end and a stiff nylon brush at the other end. Either way, these tools made possible erasure of individual typed letters. Business letters were typed on heavyweight, high-rag-content bond paper, not merely to provide a luxurious appearance, but also to stand up to erasure.

Typewriter eraser brushes were necessary for clearing eraser crumbs and paper dust, and using the brush properly was an important element of typewriting skill; if erasure detritus fell into the typewriter, a small buildup could cause the typebars to jam in their narrow supporting grooves.

=== Erasing shield ===
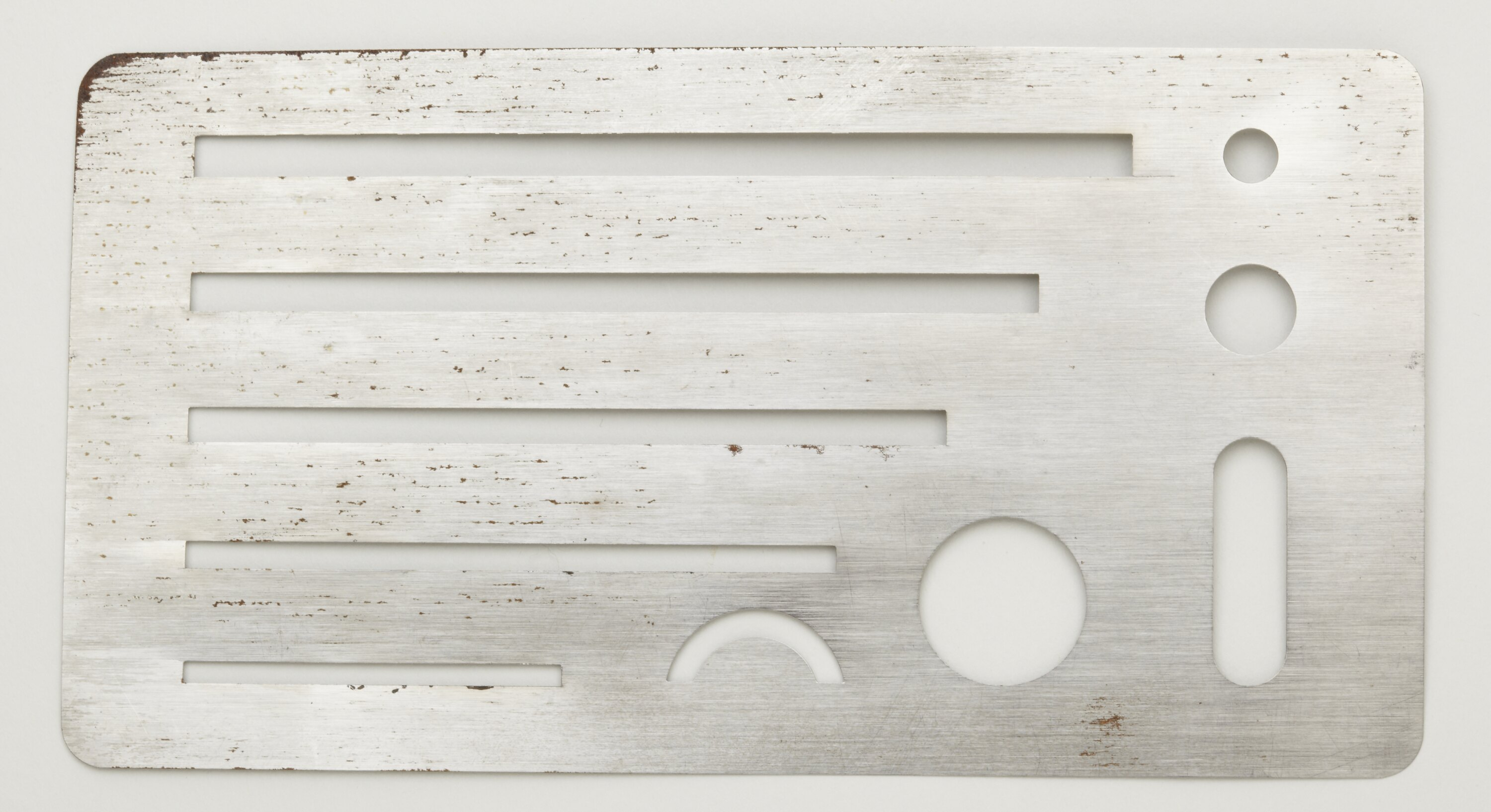
Erasing Shield (1992)

Erasing a set of carbon copies was particularly difficult, and called for the use of a device called an erasing shield or eraser shield, a thin stainless-steel rectangle about 2 by 3 inches (51 by 76 mm) with several tiny holes in it. This would prevent the pressure of erasing on the upper copies from producing carbon smudges on the lower copies. To correct copies, typists had to go from one carbon copy layer to the next carbon copy layer, trying not to get their fingers dirty as they leafed through the carbon papers, and moving and repositioning the eraser shield and eraser for each copy.

=== Erasable bond ===
Paper companies produced a special form of typewriter paper called erasable bond (for example, Eaton's Corrasable Bond). This incorporated a thin layer of material that prevented ink from penetrating and was relatively soft and easy to remove from the page. An ordinary soft pencil eraser could quickly produce perfect erasures on this type of paper. However, the same characteristics that made the paper erasable made the characters subject to smudging due to ordinary friction and deliberate alteration after the fact, making it unacceptable for business correspondence, contracts, or any archival use.

=== Correction fluid ===
In the 1950s and 1960s, correction fluid made its appearance, under brand names such as Liquid Paper, Wite-Out and Tipp-Ex; it was invented by Bette Nesmith Graham. Correction fluid was a type of opaque, white, fast-drying paint that produced a fresh white surface onto which, when dry, a correction could be retyped. However, when held to the light, the covered-up characters were visible, as was the patch of dry correction fluid (which was never perfectly flat, and frequently not a perfect match for the color, texture, and luster of the surrounding paper). The standard trick for solving this problem was photocopying the corrected page, but this was possible only with high quality photocopiers.

A different fluid was available for correcting stencils. It sealed up the stencil ready for retyping but did not attempt to color match.

== Legacy ==
=== Keyboard layouts ===
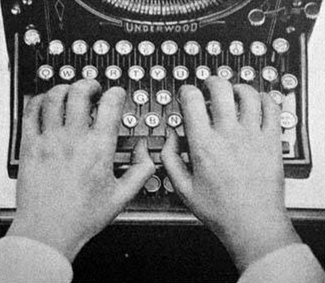
The "QWERTY" layout of typewriter keys became a de facto standard in several countries and continues to be used long after the mechanical reasons for its adoption ceased to apply.

==== QWERTY ====
The 1874 Sholes & Glidden typewriters established the "QWERTY" layout for the letter keys. During the period in which Sholes and his colleagues were experimenting with this invention, other keyboard arrangements were apparently tried, but these are poorly documented. The QWERTY layout of keys became the de facto standard for English-language typewriter and computer keyboards. Other languages written in the Latin alphabet sometimes use variants of the QWERTY layouts, such as the French AZERTY, the Italian QZERTY and the German QWERTZ layouts.

The QWERTY layout is not the most efficient layout possible for the English language. Touch-typists are required to move their fingers between rows to type the most common letters. Although the QWERTY keyboard was the most commonly used layout in typewriters, a better, less strenuous keyboard was being searched for throughout the late 1900s.

One popular but incorrect explanation for the QWERTY arrangement is that it was designed to reduce the likelihood of internal clashing of typebars by placing commonly used combinations of letters farther from each other inside the machine.

==== Other layouts for English ====
A number of radically different layouts such as Dvorak have been proposed to reduce the perceived inefficiencies of QWERTY, but none have been able to displace the QWERTY layout; their proponents claim considerable advantages, but so far none has been widely used. The Blickensderfer typewriter with its DHIATENSOR layout may have possibly been the first attempt at optimizing the keyboard layout for efficiency advantages.

On modern keyboards, the exclamation point is the shifted character on the 1 key, because these were the last characters to become "standard" on keyboards. Holding the spacebar down usually suspended the carriage advance mechanism (a so-called "dead key" feature), allowing one to superimpose multiple keystrikes on a single location. The ¢ symbol (meaning cents) was located above the number 6 on American electric typewriters, whereas ANSI-INCITS-standard computer keyboards have ^ instead.

==== Keyboards for other languages ====
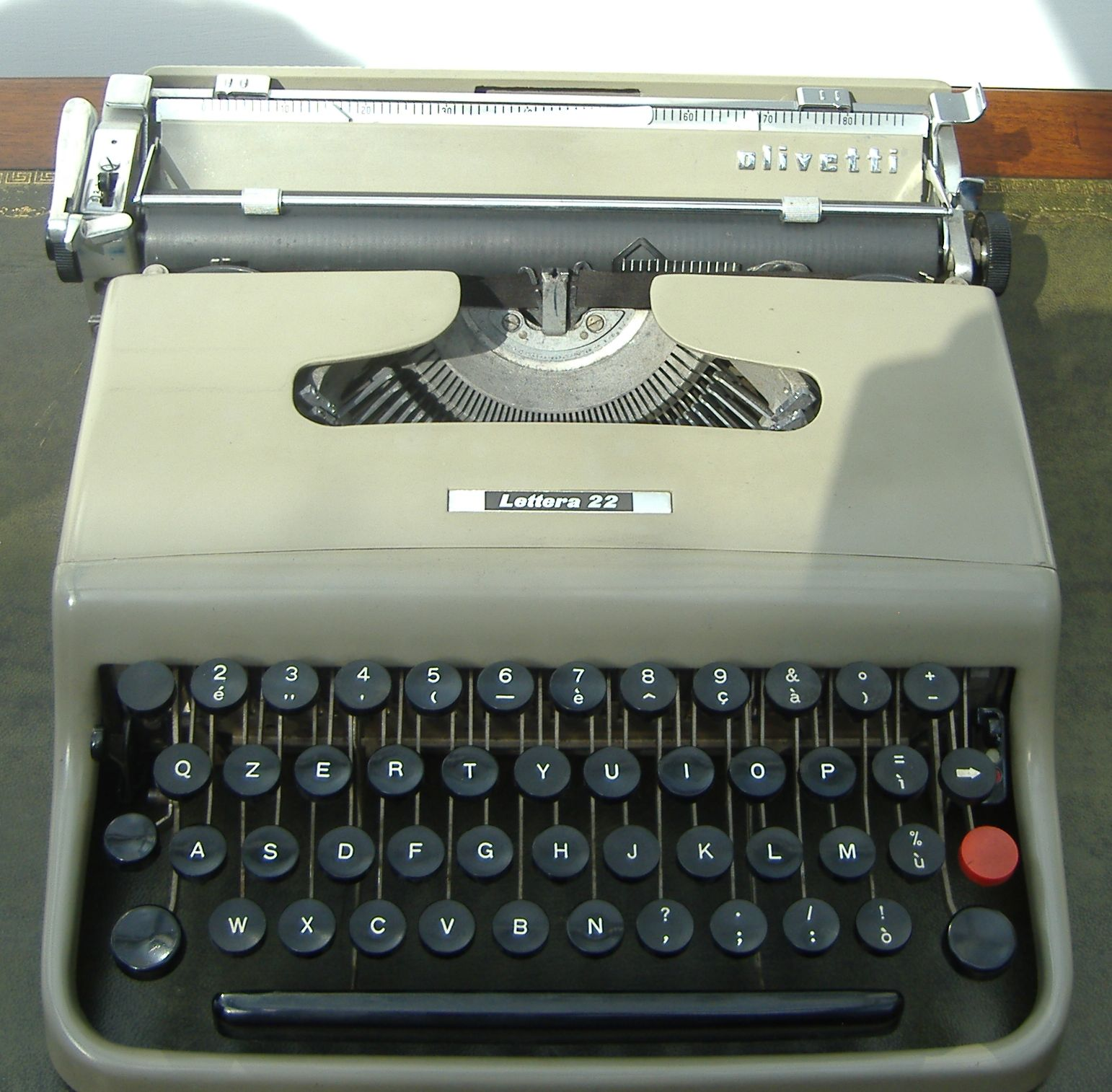
Italian typewriter Olivetti Lettera 22

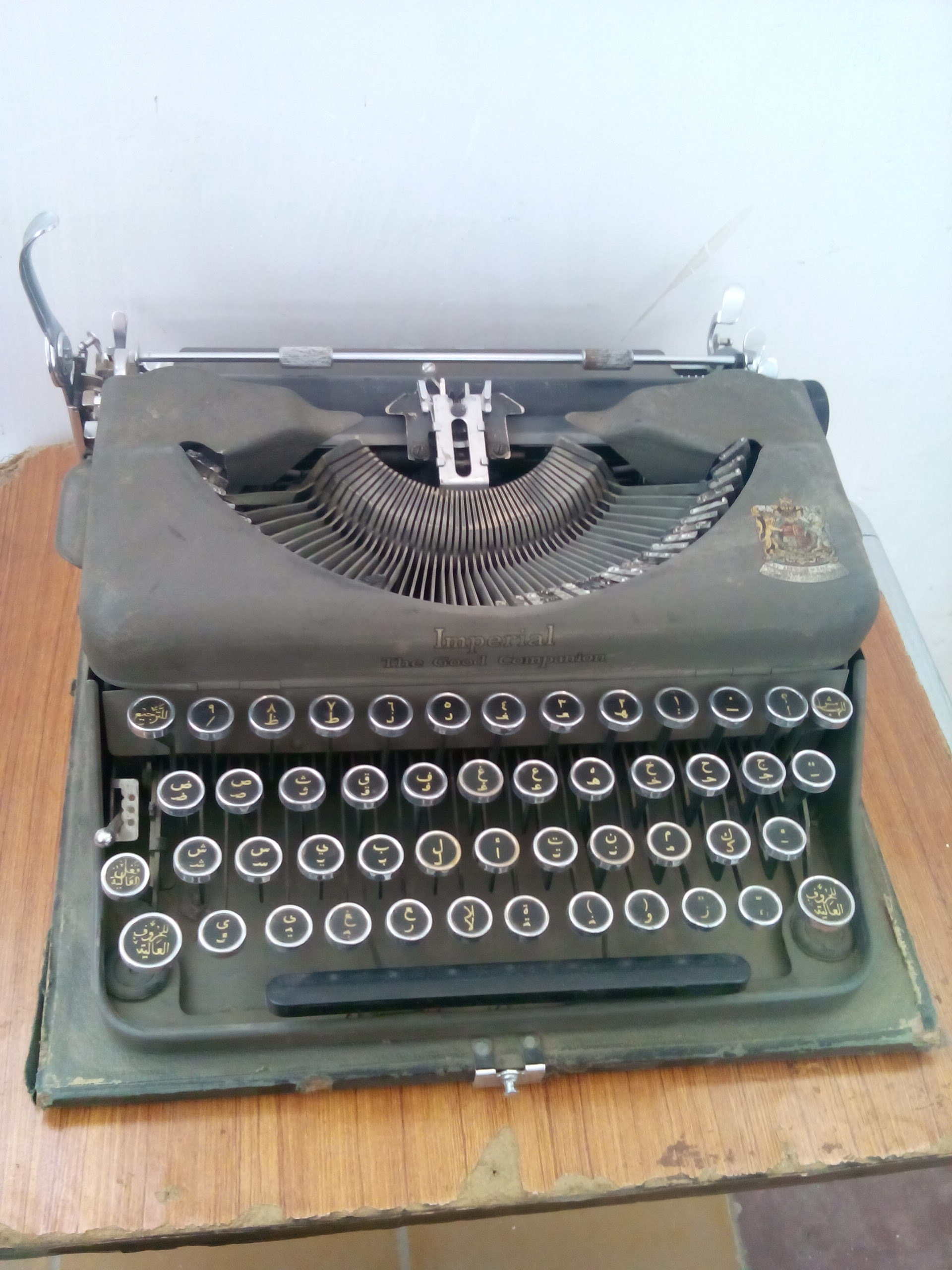
Arabic typewriter Imperial Typewriter Company

The keyboards for other Latin languages are broadly similar to QWERTY but are optimised for the relevant orthography. In addition to some changes in the order of letters, perhaps the most obvious is the presence of precomposed characters and diacritics.

Many non-Latin alphabets have keyboard layouts that have nothing to do with QWERTY. The Russian layout, for instance, puts the common trigrams ыва, про, and ить on adjacent keys so that they can be typed by rolling the fingers.

Text in the Arabic alphabet is written from right to left (rather than from left to right): consequently, the carriage on an Arabic typewriter moves to the right after each keystroke. In Arabic script, letters take different shapes depending upon their position in the word and whether they are connected to a preceding letter. A special key is used to allow switching between independent and connected letters.

Typewriters were also made for East Asian languages with thousands of characters, such as Chinese or Japanese. They were not easy to operate, but professional typists used them for a long time until the development of electronic word processors and laser printers in the 1980s.

=== Typewriter conventions ===
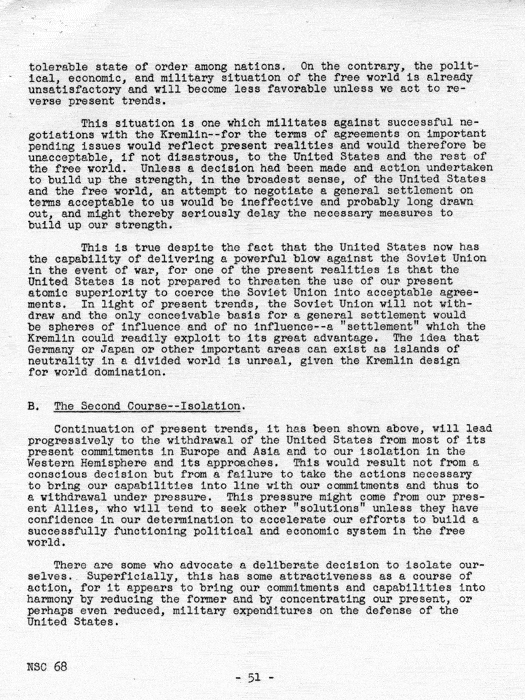
This typed page uses a number of typographic conventions stemming from the mechanical limitations of the typewriter: two hyphens in place of an em dash, double sentence spacing, straight quotation marks, tab indents for paragraphs, and double carriage returns between paragraphs.

A number of typographical conventions stem from the typewriter's characteristics and limitations. For example, the QWERTY keyboard typewriter did not include keys for the en dash and the em dash. To overcome this limitation, users typically typed more than one adjacent hyphen to approximate these symbols. This typewriter convention is still sometimes used today, although modern computer word processing applications can input the correct en and em dashes for each font type.

Other examples of typewriter practices that are sometimes still used in desktop publishing systems include inserting a double space between sentences, and the use of the typewriter apostrophe, ', and straight quotes, ", as quotation marks and prime marks. The practice of underlining text in place of italics and the use of all capitals to provide emphasis are additional examples of typographical conventions that derived from the limitations of the typewriter keyboard that still carry on today.

Many older typewriters did not include a separate key for the numeral 1 or the exclamation point !, and some even older ones also lacked the numeral zero, 0. Typists who trained on these machines learned the habit of using the lowercase letter l ("ell") for the digit 1, and the uppercase O ("oh") for the zero. A cents symbol, ¢ was created by combining (over-striking) a lower case c with a slash character (typing c, then backspace, then /). Similarly, the exclamation point was created by combining an apostrophe and a period ('+. ≈!).

Using the punctuation characters available on a typewriter to create vertical and horizontal framing lines was common in the era of typewriters – and continues to be used in some 'caption pages' (title pages in legal filings) today.

=== Terminology repurposed for the computer age ===
Some terminology from the typewriter age has survived into the computer era.

- backspace (BS) – a keystroke that moved the cursor backwards one position (on a typewriter, this moved the physical platen backwards), to enable a character to be overtyped. Originally this was used to combine characters (for example, the sequence ', backspace, . to make !). Subsequently, it facilitated "erase and retype" corrections (using correction tape or fluid). Only the latter concept has survived into the computer age.
- carbon copy – a copy, typically of a typewritten document, made using carbon paper. The convention cc:, standing for "carbon copy" is nowadays used in electronic mail systems to identify secondary recipients to whom copies of an electronic mail message should be sent.
- carriage return (CR) – return to the first column of text. (Most typewriters switched automatically to the next line. In computer systems, "line feed" (see below) is a function that is controlled independently.)
- cursor – a marker used to indicate where the next character will be printed. The cursor was originally a term to describe the clear slider on a slide rule; on typewriters, it was the paper that moved and the insertion point was fixed.
- cut and paste – taking text, a numerical table, or an image and pasting it into a document. The term originated when such compound documents were created using manual paste up techniques for typographic page layout. Actual brushes and paste were later replaced by hot-wax machines equipped with cylinders that applied melted adhesive wax to developed prints of "typeset" copy. This copy was then cut out with knives and rulers, and slid into position on layout sheets on slanting layout tables. After the "copy" had been correctly positioned and squared up using a T-square and set square, it was pressed down with a brayer, or roller. The whole point of the exercise was to create so-called "camera-ready copy" which existed only to be photographed and then printed, usually by offset lithography.
- dead key – a key that, when typed, does not advance the typing position, thus allowing another character to be overstruck on top of the original character. This was typically used to combine diacritical marks with letters they modified (e.g., è can be generated by first pressing ` and then e). In Europe, where most languages have diacritics, a typical mechanical arrangement meant that hitting the accent key typed the symbol but did not advance the carriage; consequently, the next character to be typed 'landed' on the same position. It was this method that carried across to the computer age whereas an alternative method (press the space bar simultaneously) did not.
- line feed (LF), also called "newline" – whereas most typewriters rolled the paper forward automatically on a carriage return, this is an explicit control character on computer systems that moves the cursor to the next on-screen line of text (but not to the beginning of that line—a CR is also needed if that effect is desired).
- shift – a modifier key used to type capital letters and other alternate "upper case" characters; when pressed and held down, would shift a typewriter's mechanism to allow a different typebar impression (such as 'D' instead of 'd') to press into the ribbon and print on a page. The concept of a shift key or modifier key was later extended to Ctrl, Alt, AltGr and Super ("Windows" or "Apple") keys on modern computer keyboards. The generalized concept of a shift key reached its apex in the MIT space-cadet keyboard.
- tab (HT), shortened from "horizontal tab" or "tabulator stop" – caused the print position to advance horizontally to the next pre-set "tab stop". This was used for typing lists and tables with vertical columns of numbers or words.
  - The vertical tab (VT) control character, named by analogy with HT, was designed for use with early computer line printers, and would cause the fan-fold paper to be fed until the next line's position.
- tty, short for teletypewriter – used in Unix-like operating systems to designate a given "terminal".

== Social effects ==
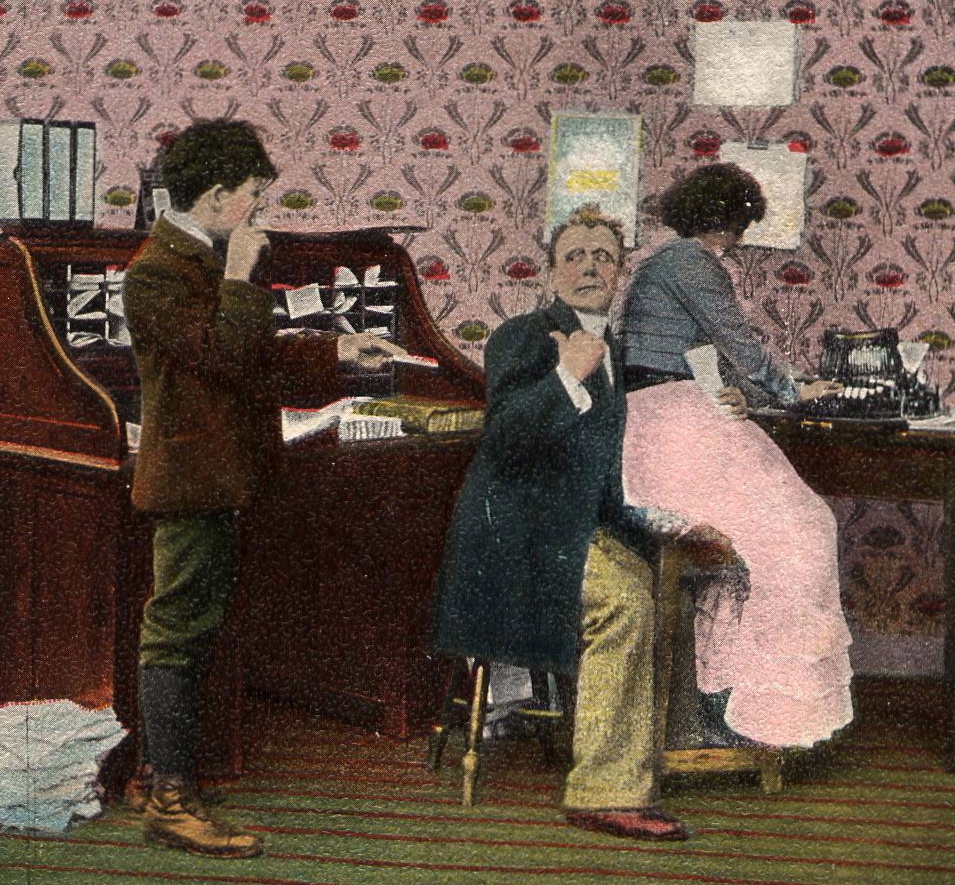
Putatively humorous "Get out! Can't you see I'm busy" postcard (1900s)

Typewriter manufacturers at first found selling the device difficult. Potential customers compared the $125 Remington product to a pen costing one penny. Recipients of typewritten letters sometimes felt insulted, believing that the sender was implying that the recipient was unable to read handwriting. Manufacturers had to train customers to use their products, and offered free services referring typists and stenographers to employers. Business colleges began teaching typing.

Traditionally, office work was a man's job, and they would hand write the records. When World War I happened, many men left to fight, and women filled in many of the open industry and clerical roles. Even when Remington started marketing typewriters, the company assumed the machine would not be used for composing but for transcribing dictation, and that the person typing would be a woman. The 1800s Sholes and Glidden typewriter had floral ornamentation on the case.

During World Wars I and II, increasing numbers of women were entering the workforce. In the United States, women often started in the professional workplace as copy typists. Being a typist was considered the right choice for a "good girl", meaning women who presented themselves as being chaste and having good conduct. It was also considered the right choice because it wasn't taking a job away from a man. According to the 1900 census, 94.9% of stenographers and typists were unmarried women.

Questions about morals made a salacious businessman making sexual advances to a female typist into a cliché of office life, appearing in vaudeville and movies. The "Tijuana bibles"—adult comic books produced in Mexico for the American market, starting in the 1930s—often featured women typists. In one panel, a businessman in a three-piece suit, ogling his secretary's thigh, says, "Miss Higby, are you ready for—ahem!—er—dictation?"

The typewriter was a useful machine during the censorship era of the Soviet government, starting during the Russian Civil War (1917–1922). Samizdat was a form of surreptitious self-publication used when the government was censoring what literature the public could see. The Soviet government signed a Decree on Press which prohibited the publishing of any written work that had not been previously officially reviewed and approved. Unapproved work was copied manually, most often on typewriters. In 1983, a new law required anyone who needed a typewriter to get police permission to buy or keep one. In addition, the owner would have to register a typed sample of all its letters and numbers, to ensure that any illegal literature typed with it could be traced back to its source. The typewriter became increasingly popular as the interest in prohibited books grew.

== Writers with notable associations with typewriters ==
=== Early adopters ===
- Henry James dictated to a typist.
- Mark Twain wrote in his autobiography that he and Petroleum V. Nasby saw a Remington typewriter in a store window in Boston in autumn 1874. Twain bought it out of curiosity, and Nasby invested in a company selling the product. By December 1874 Twain was using it in personal correspondence. Remington cited his use of the product in its first product catalog. Twain claimed that he was the first important writer to present a publisher with a typewritten manuscript, for The Adventures of Tom Sawyer (1876). Research showed that Twain's memory was incorrect and that the first book submitted in typed form was Life on the Mississippi (1883, also by Twain).

=== Others ===
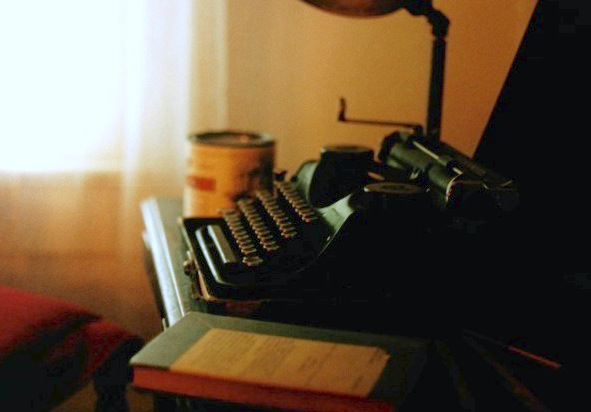
William Faulkner's Underwood Universal Portable in his office at Rowan Oak, which is now maintained by the University of Mississippi in Oxford as a museum

- William S. Burroughs wrote in some of his novels—and possibly believed—that "a machine he called the 'Soft Typewriter' was writing our lives, and our books, into existence", according to a book review in The New Yorker. In the 1991 film adaptation of his 1959 novel Naked Lunch, his typewriter is a living, insect-like entity (voiced by North American actor Peter Boretski) and actually dictates the book to him.
- J. R. R. Tolkien was accustomed to typing from awkward positions: "balancing his typewriter on his attic bed, because there was no room on his desk".
- Jack Kerouac, a fast typist at 100 words per minute, typed his 1957 novel On the Road on a roll of paper so he would not be interrupted by having to change the paper. Within two weeks of starting to write On the Road, Kerouac had one single-spaced paragraph, 120 feet (37 m) long. Some scholars say the scroll was shelf paper; others contend it was a Thermal-fax roll; another theory is that the roll consisted of sheets of architect's paper taped together. Kerouac himself stated that he used 100-foot (30 m) rolls of teletype paper.
- Don Marquis purposely used the limitations of a typewriter (or more precisely, a particular typist) in his archy and mehitabel series of newspaper columns, which were later compiled into a series of books. According to his literary conceit, a cockroach named "Archy" was a reincarnated free-verse poet, who would type articles overnight by jumping onto the keys of a manual typewriter. The writings were typed completely in lower case, because of the cockroach's inability to generate the heavy force needed to operate the shift key. The lone exception is the poem "CAPITALS AT LAST" from archys life of mehitabel, written in 1933.

=== Late users ===
- Richard Polt, a philosophy professor at Xavier University in Cincinnati who collects typewriters, has edited ETCetera, a quarterly magazine about historic writing machines, and is the author of the book The Typewriter Revolution: A Typist's Companion for the 21st Century.
- William Gibson used a Hermes 2000 model manual typewriter to write his 1984 novel Neuromancer and half of Count Zero (1983) before a mechanical failure and lack of replacement parts forced him to upgrade to an Apple IIc computer.
- Harlan Ellison used typewriters for his entire career, and when he was no longer able to have them repaired, learned to do it himself; he repeatedly stated his belief that computers are bad for writing, maintaining that "Art is not supposed to be easier!"
- Cormac McCarthy wrote his novels on an Olivetti Lettera 32 typewriter until his death. In 2009, the Lettera he obtained from a pawn shop in 1963, on which nearly all his novels and screenplays were written, was auctioned for charity at Christie's for US$254,500; McCarthy obtained an identical replacement for $20 to continue writing on.
- Will Self explains why he uses a manual typewriter: "I think the computer user does their thinking on the screen, and the non-computer user is compelled, because he or she has to retype a whole text, to do a lot more thinking in the head."
- Ted Kaczynski (the "Unabomber") used two old manual typewriters to write his polemic essays and messages.
- Actor Tom Hanks uses and collects manual typewriters. To control the size of his collection, he gifts autographed machines to appreciative fans and repair shops around the world.
- Biographer Robert Caro has used various models of the Smith Corona Electra 210 to write his biographies of Robert Moses and Lyndon Johnson.

== Typewriters in popular culture ==
=== In music ===
- Erik Satie's 1917 score for the ballet Parade includes a "Mach. à écrire" as a percussion instrument, along with (elsewhere) a roulette wheel and a pistol.
- The composer Leroy Anderson wrote The Typewriter (1950) for orchestra and typewriter, and it has since been used as the theme for numerous radio programs. The solo instrument is a real typewriter played by a percussionist. The piece was later made famous by comedian Jerry Lewis as part of his regular routine both on screen and stage, most notably in the 1963 film Who's Minding the Store?.
- A typewriter plays an integral part (and is used on stage as a prop) in the song 'Opening Doors', from Stephen Sondheim's musical Merrily We Roll Along (1981).
- Wordy Rappinghood, a 1981 single by Tom Tom Club, opens with the sound of a typewriter.
- Typewriter samples are woven into the texture of 'Dissidents', the opening track of Thomas Dolby's 1984 album The Flat Earth.
- The Boston Typewriter Orchestra (BTO), a comedic musical percussion group, has performed at numerous art festivals, clubs, and parties since 2004.
- Max Richter's The Blue Notebooks (2004) features the sound of the typewriter underneath the narration of Tilda Swinton.
- South Korean improviser Ryu Hankil frequently performs on typewriters, most prominently in his 2009 album Becoming Typewriter.

=== Other ===
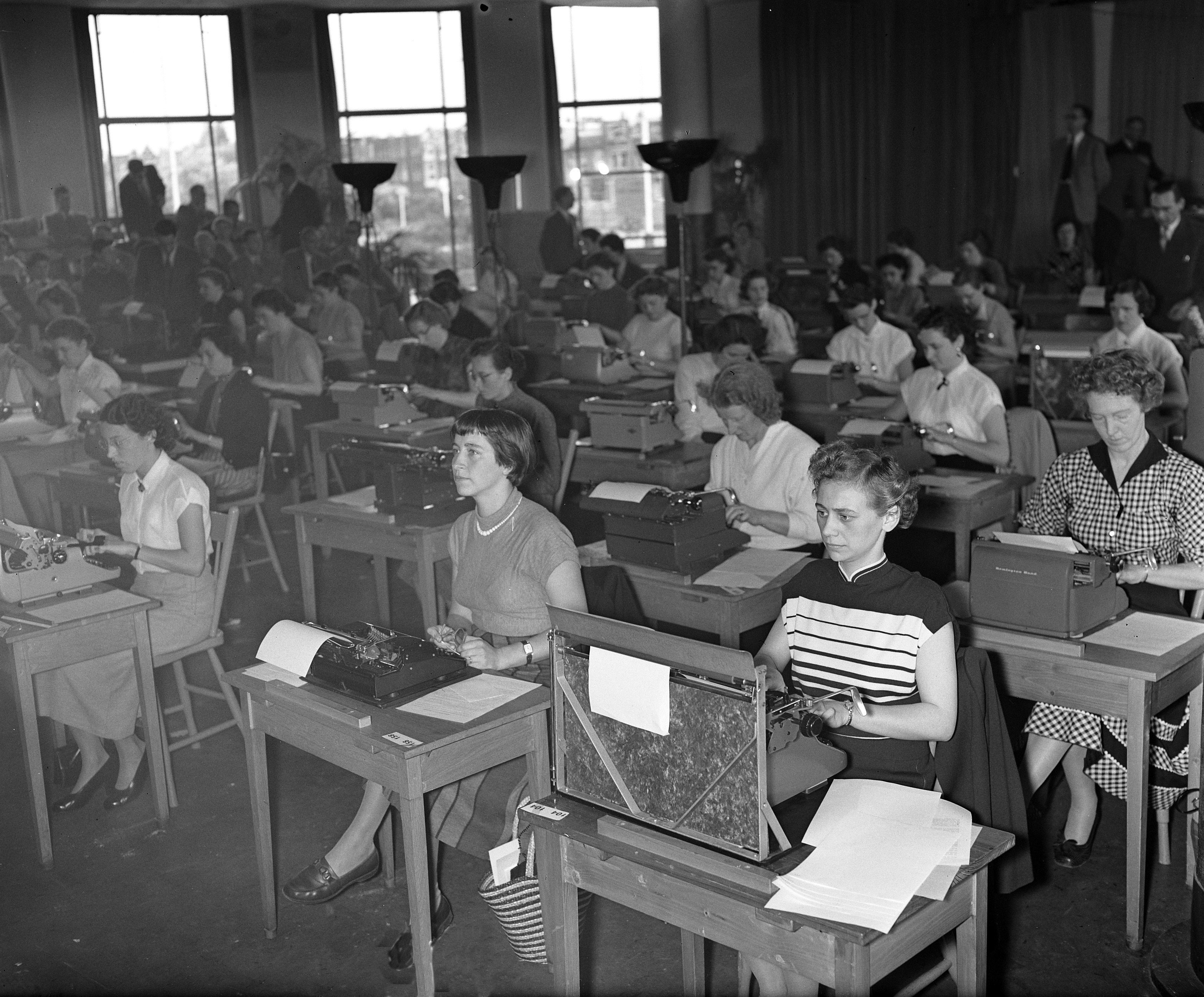
Typewriting speed competition (The Hague, 1954)

- The 2012 French comedy movie Populaire, starring Romain Duris and Déborah François, centers on a young secretary in the 1950s striving to win typewriting speed competitions.
- The manga (2015–2020) and anime (2018) Violet Evergarden series follows a disabled war veteran who learns to type because her handwriting has been impaired, and soon she becomes a popular typist.
- California Typewriter, a 2016 documentary film, investigates the culture of typewriter enthusiasts, including an eponymous repair store in Berkeley, California.

== Forensic examination ==
Typewritten documents may be examined by forensic document examiners. This is done primarily to determine the make and/or model of the typewriter used to produce a document, or whether or not a particular suspect typewriter might have been used to produce a document.

The determination of a make and/or model of typewriter is a "classification" problem and several systems have been developed for this purpose. These include the original Haas Typewriter Atlases (Pica version) and (Non-Pica version) and the TYPE system developed by Philip Bouffard, the Royal Canadian Mounted Police's Termatrex Typewriter classification system, and Interpol's typewriter classification system, among others.

The earliest reference in fictional literature to the potential identification of a typewriter as having produced a document was by Sir Arthur Conan Doyle, who wrote the Sherlock Holmes short story "A Case of Identity" in 1891.

In non-fiction, the first document examiner to describe how a typewriter might be identified was William E. Hagan who wrote, in 1894, "All typewriter machines, even when using the same kind of type, become more or less peculiar by use as to the work done by them." Other early discussions of the topic were provided by A. S. Osborn in his 1908 treatise, Typewriting as Evidence, and again in his 1929 textbook, Questioned Documents.

A modern description of the examination procedure is laid out in ASTM Standard E2494-08 (Standard Guide for Examination of Typewritten Items).

Typewriter examination was used in the Leopold and Loeb and Alger Hiss cases.

In Romania, according to State Council Decree No. 98 of 28 March 1983, owning a typewriter, both by businesses or by private persons, was subject to an approval given by the local police authorities. People previously convicted of any crime or those who, because of their behaviour, were considered to be "a danger to public order or to the security of the state" were refused approval. In addition, once a year, typewriter owners had to take the typewriter to the local police station, where they would be asked to type a sample of all the typewriter's characters. It was also forbidden to borrow, lend, or repair typewriters other than at the places that had been authorized by the police.

== Collections ==
Public and private collections of typewriters exist around the world, including:

- Schreibmaschinenmuseum Peter Mitterhofer (Parcines, Italy)
- Museo della Macchina da Scrivere (Milan, Italy)
- Liverpool Typewriter Museum (Liverpool, England)
- Museum of Printing – MoP (Haverhill, Massachusetts, US)
- Chestnut Ridge Typewriter Museum (Fairmont, West Virginia, US)
- Technical Museum of the Empordà (Figueres, Girona, Spain)
- Musée de la machine à écrire (Lausanne, Switzerland)
- Lu Hanbin Typewriter Museum Shanghai (Shanghai, China)
- Wattens Typewriter Museum (Wattens, Austria)
- German Typewriter Museum (Bayreuth, Germany)
- Tayfun Talipoğlu Typewriter Museum (Odunpazarı, Eskişehir, Turkey)
- Museums Victoria Collections (Victoria, Australia)

Several online-only virtual museums collect and display information about typewriters and their history:

- Virtual Typewriter Museum
- Chuck & Rich's Antique Typewriter Website
- Mr. Martin's Typewriter Museum

== Gallery ==
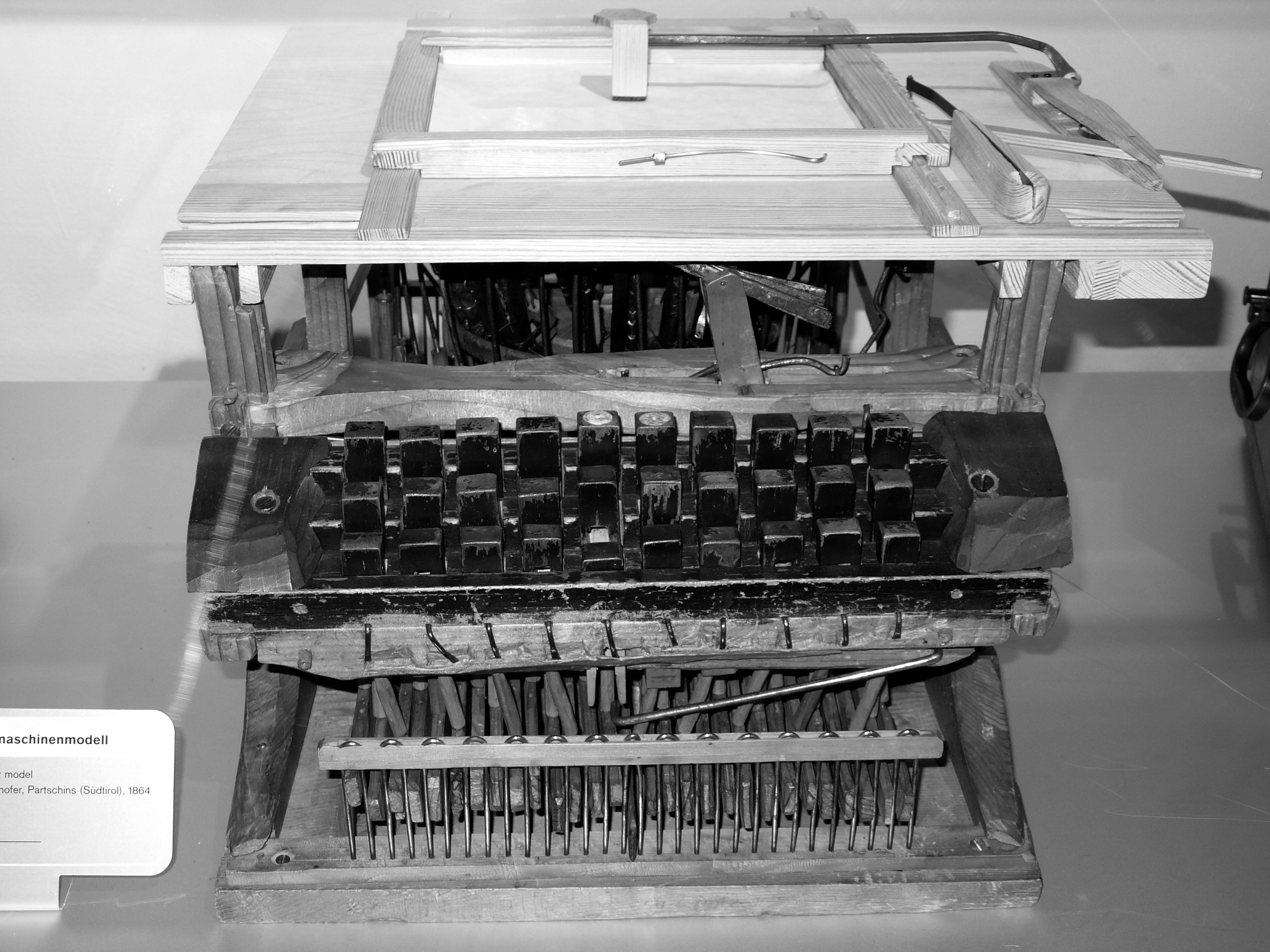
Peter Mitterhofer 1864 typewriter

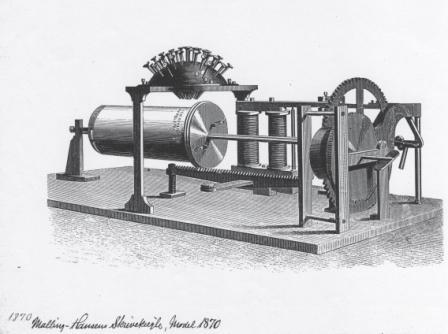
Hansen Writing Ball, invented in 1865 (1870 model)

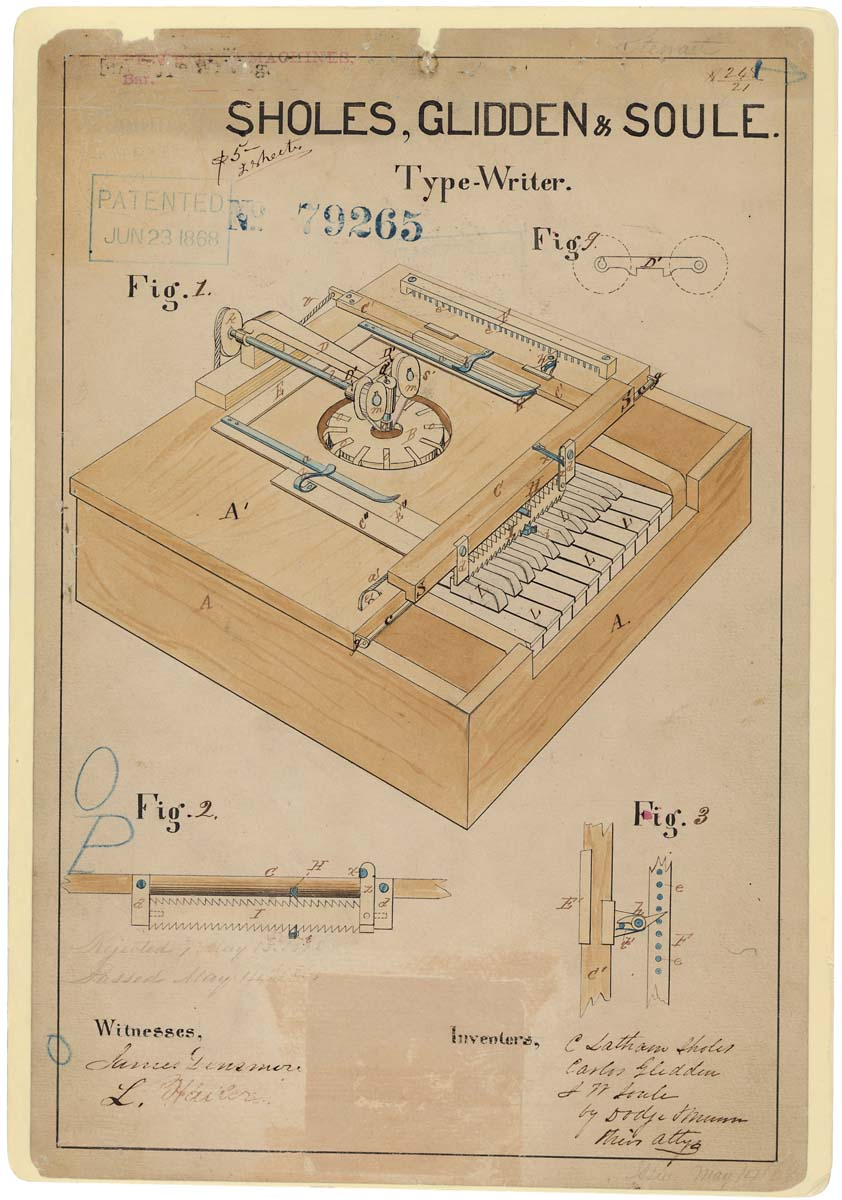
1868 patent drawing for the Sholes, Glidden, and Soule typewriter

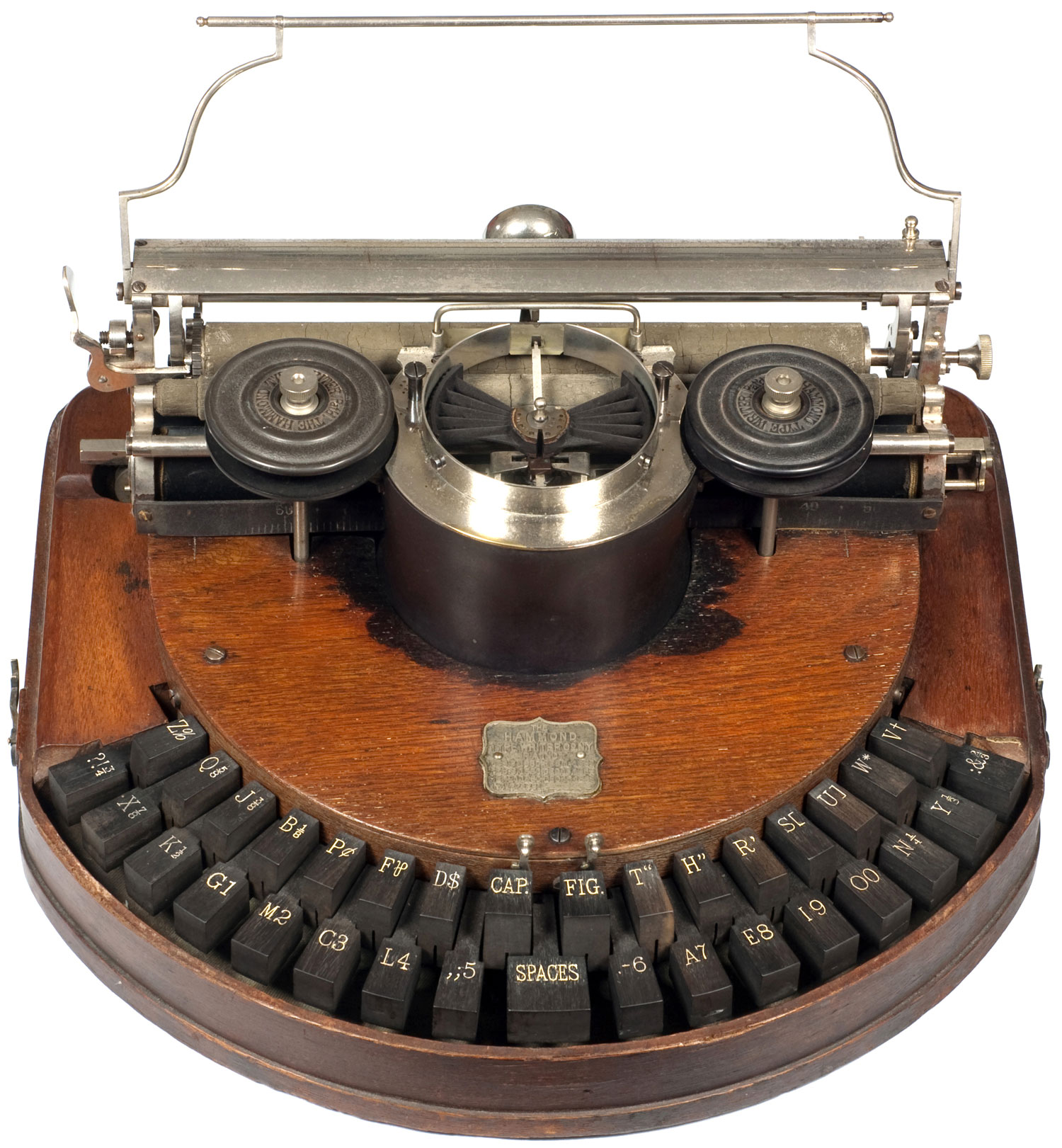
Hammond 1 typewriter, 1885

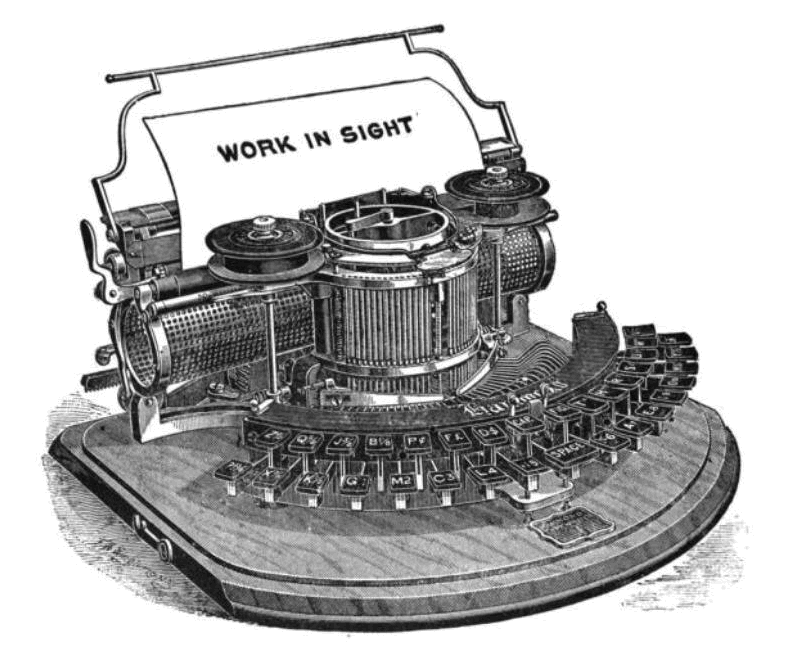
Hammond 1B typewriter, invented 1870s, manufactured 1881

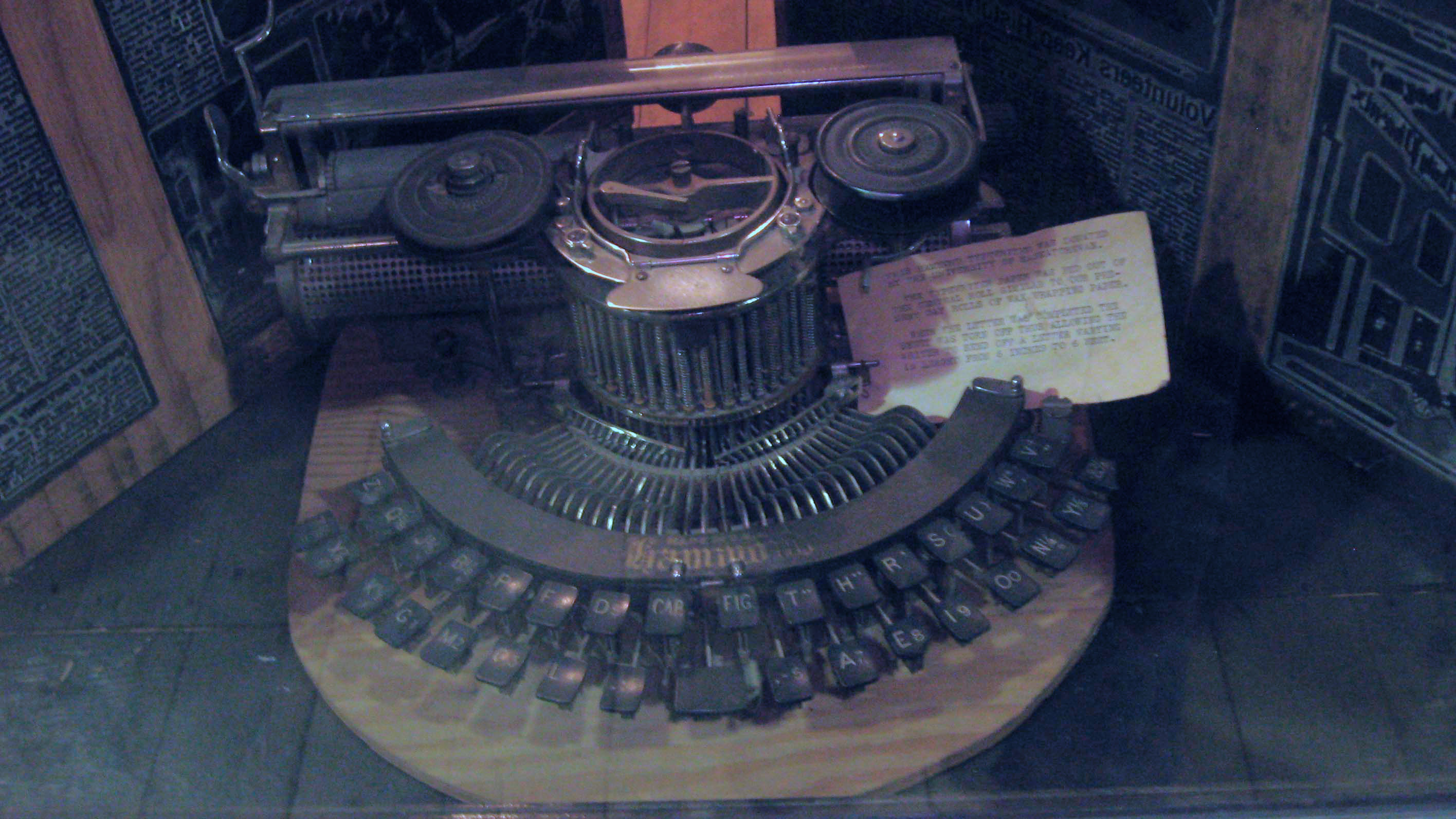
Hammond 1B, as used by a newspaper office in Saskatoon around 1910

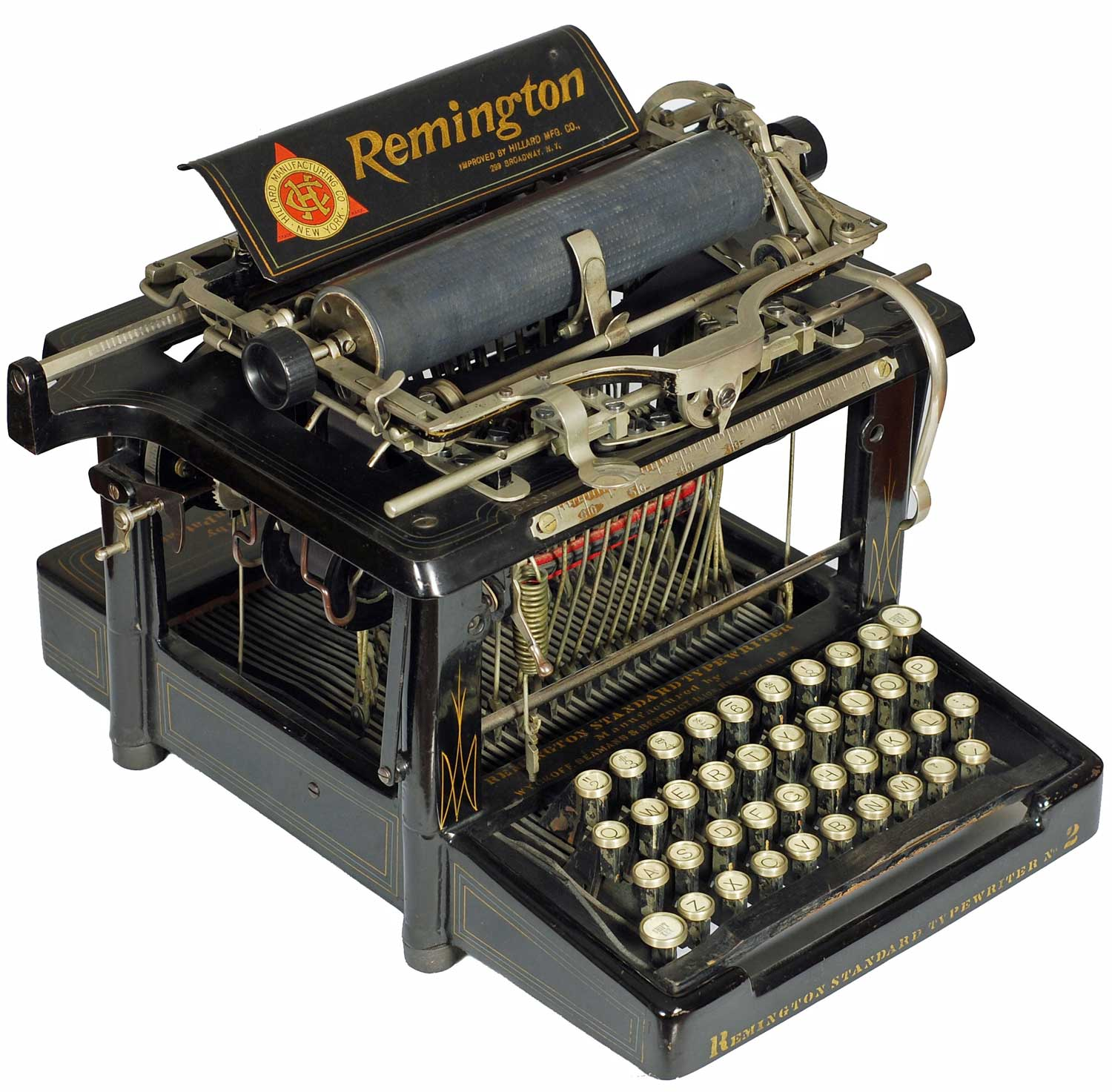
Remington 2 typewriter, 1878

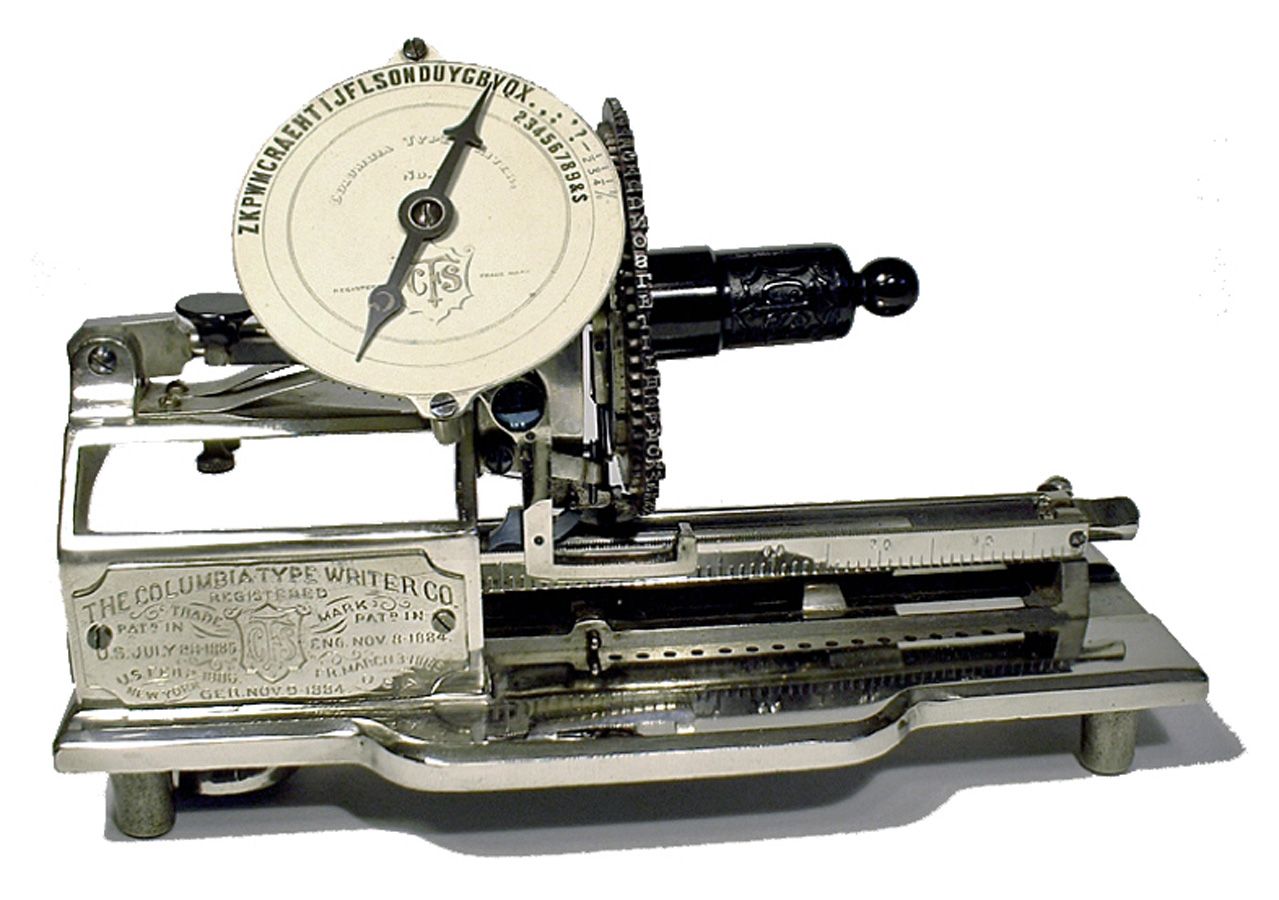
Columbia 2, 1886 – early index typewriter with proportional spacing

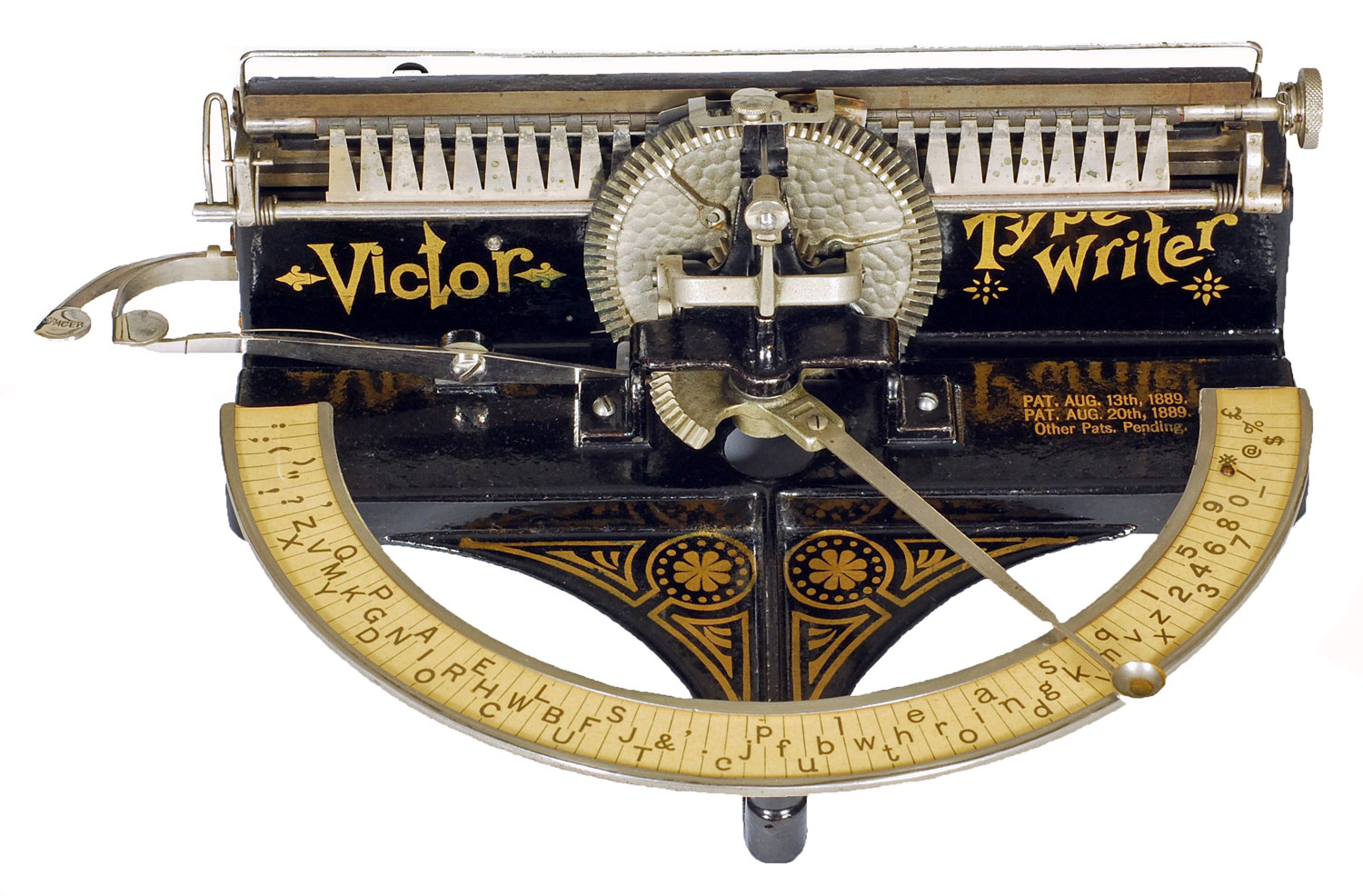
Victor index typewriter, 1889 – first successful model to use a daisy wheel

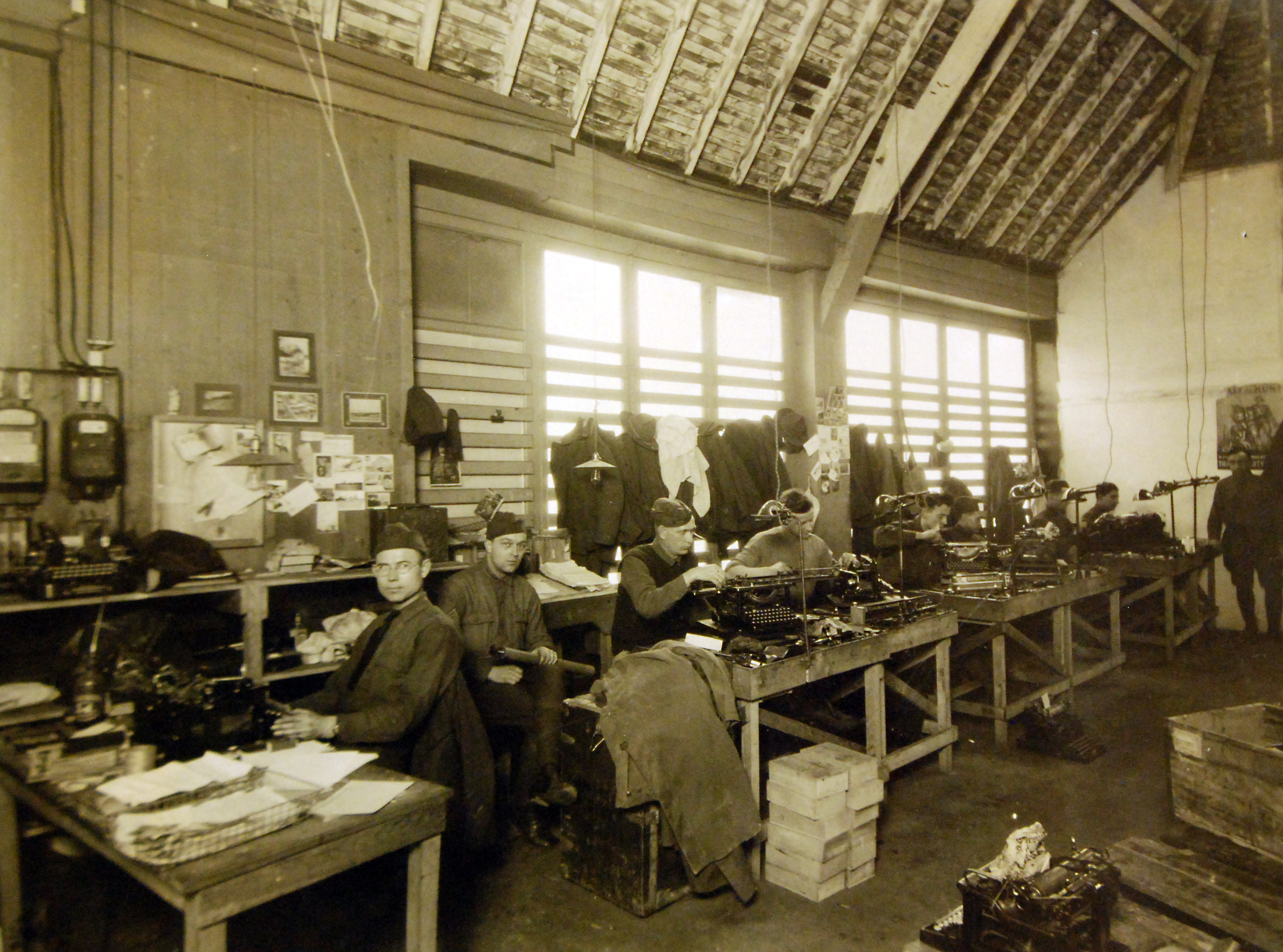
US Army Quartermaster soldiers in typewriter repair shop, Tours, France, 1919

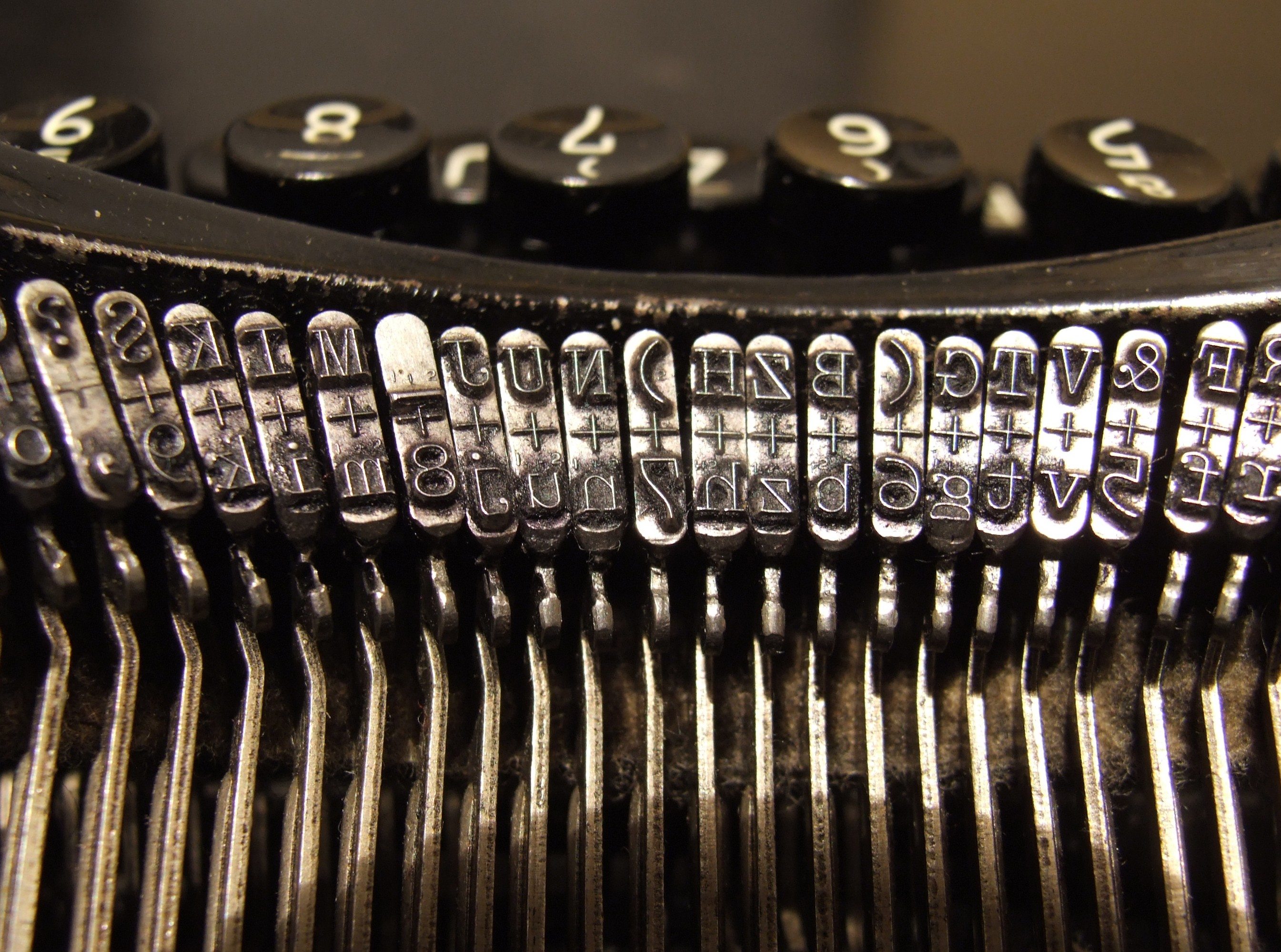
Typebars in a 1920s typewriter

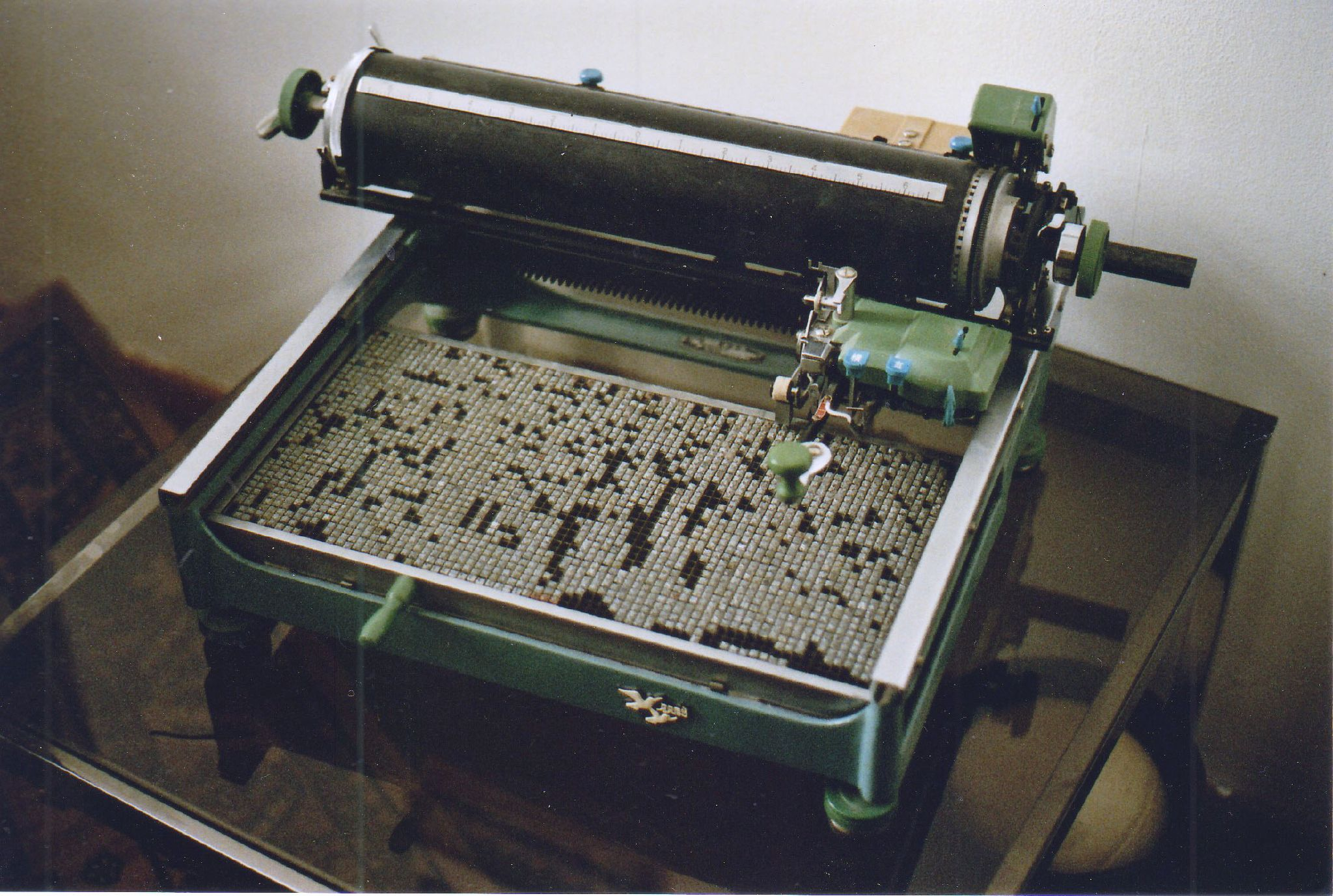
Chinese typewriter (index-type) produced by Shuangge, with 2,450 characters

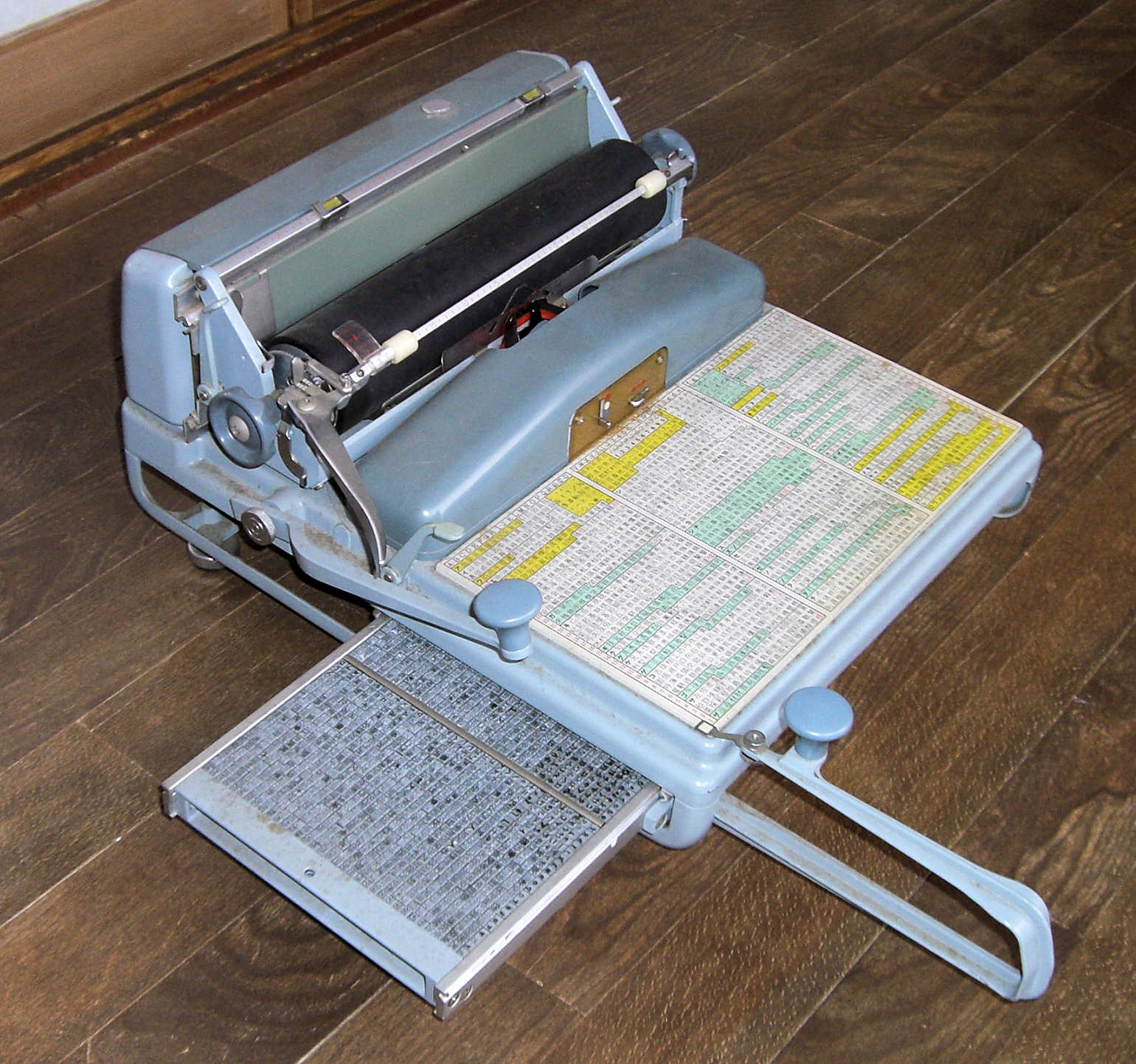
Japanese typewriter SH-280, an index-type machine with 2,268 characters

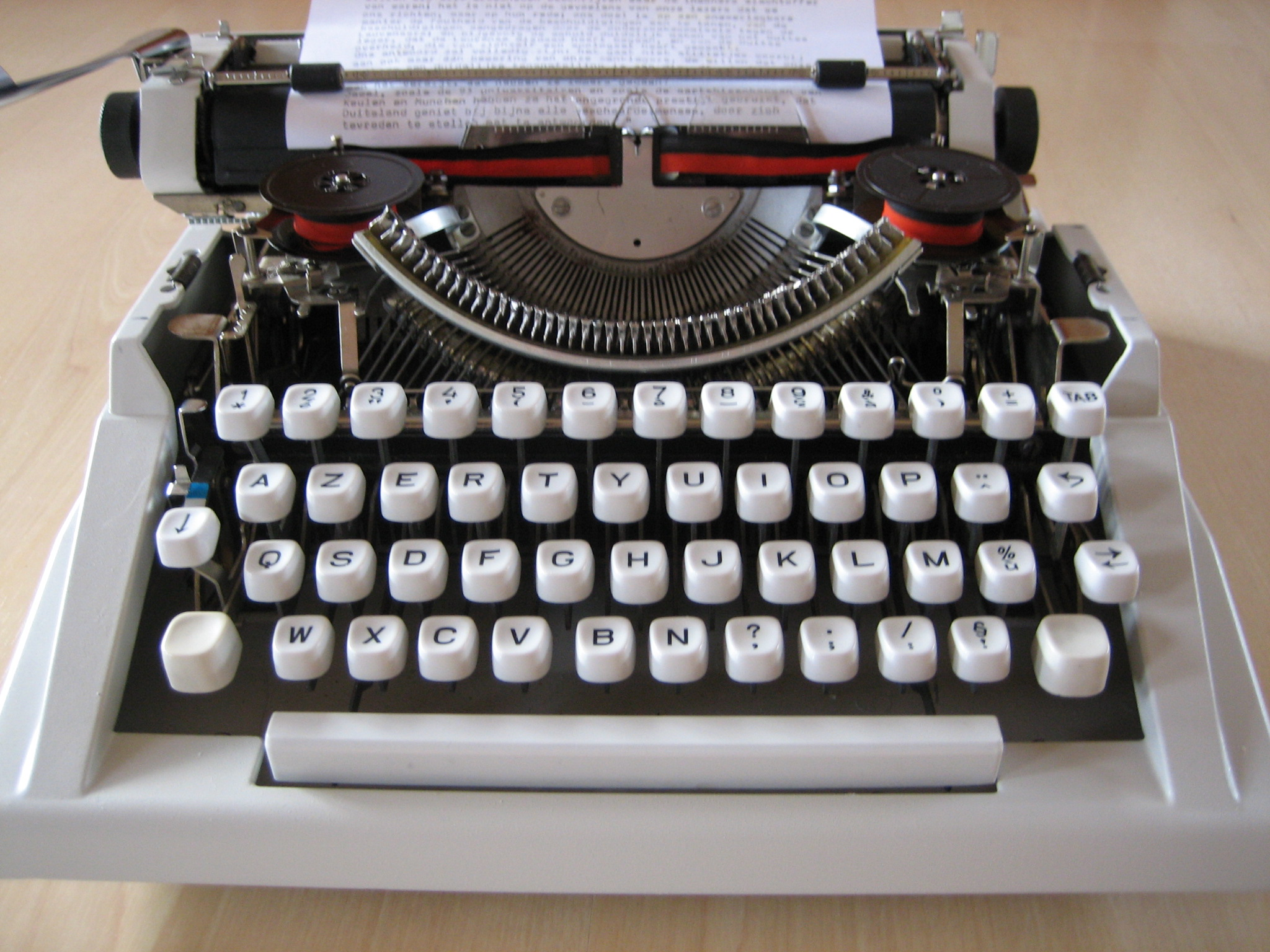
Hermes 3000 typewriter (with ribbon cover removed)

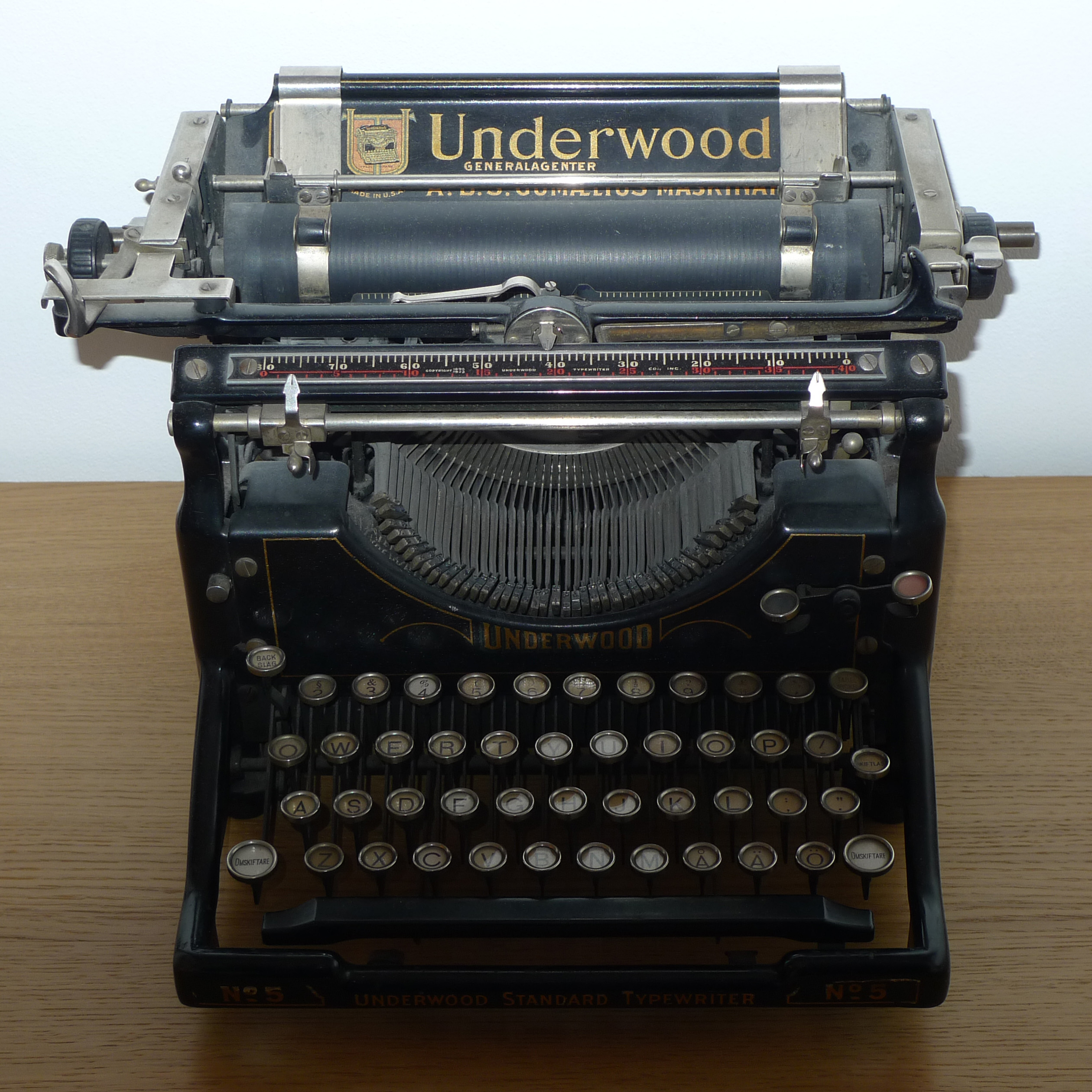
1920s Underwood typewriter with Swedish layout

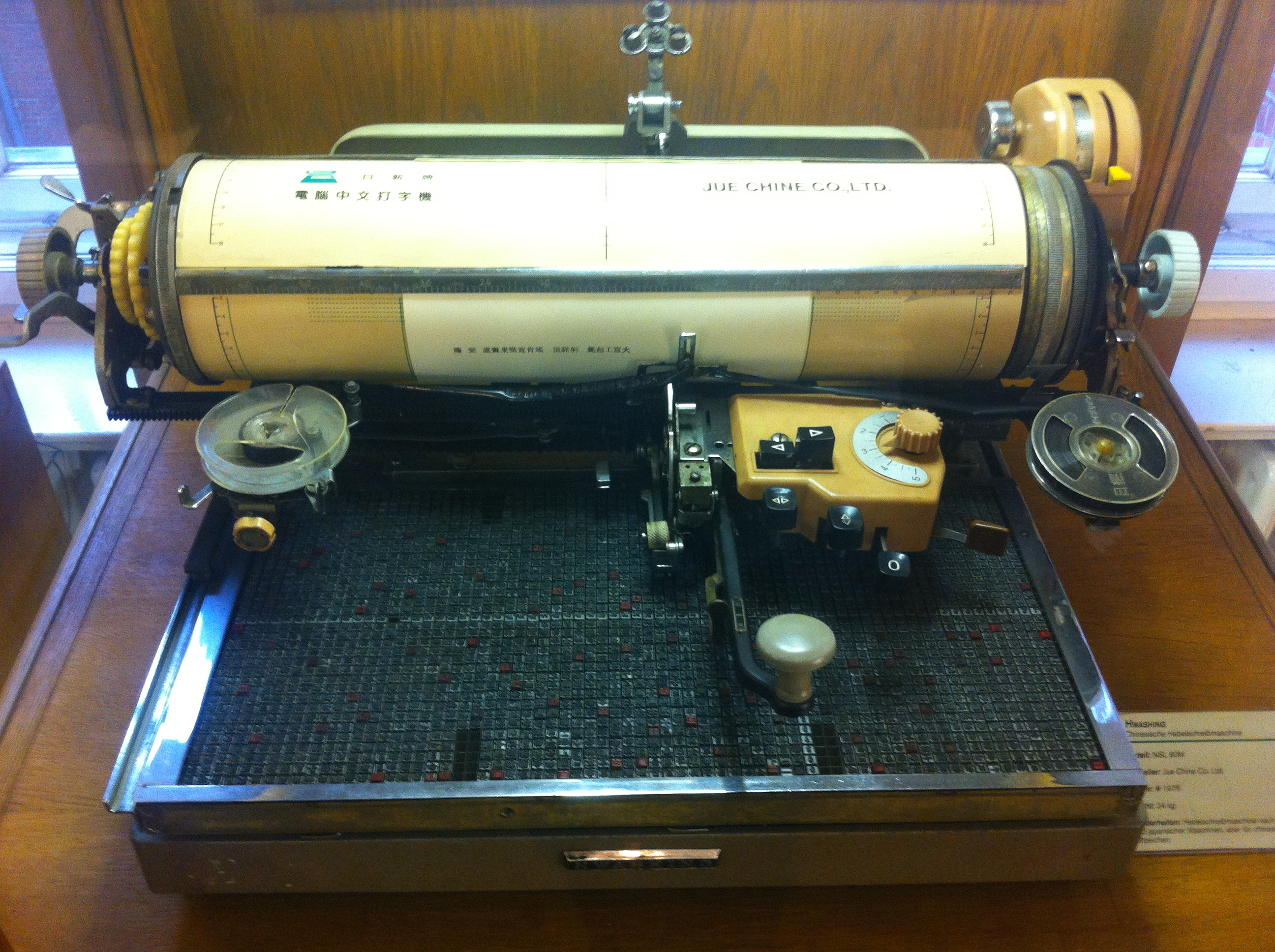
Chinese typewriter at Deutsches Technikmuseum

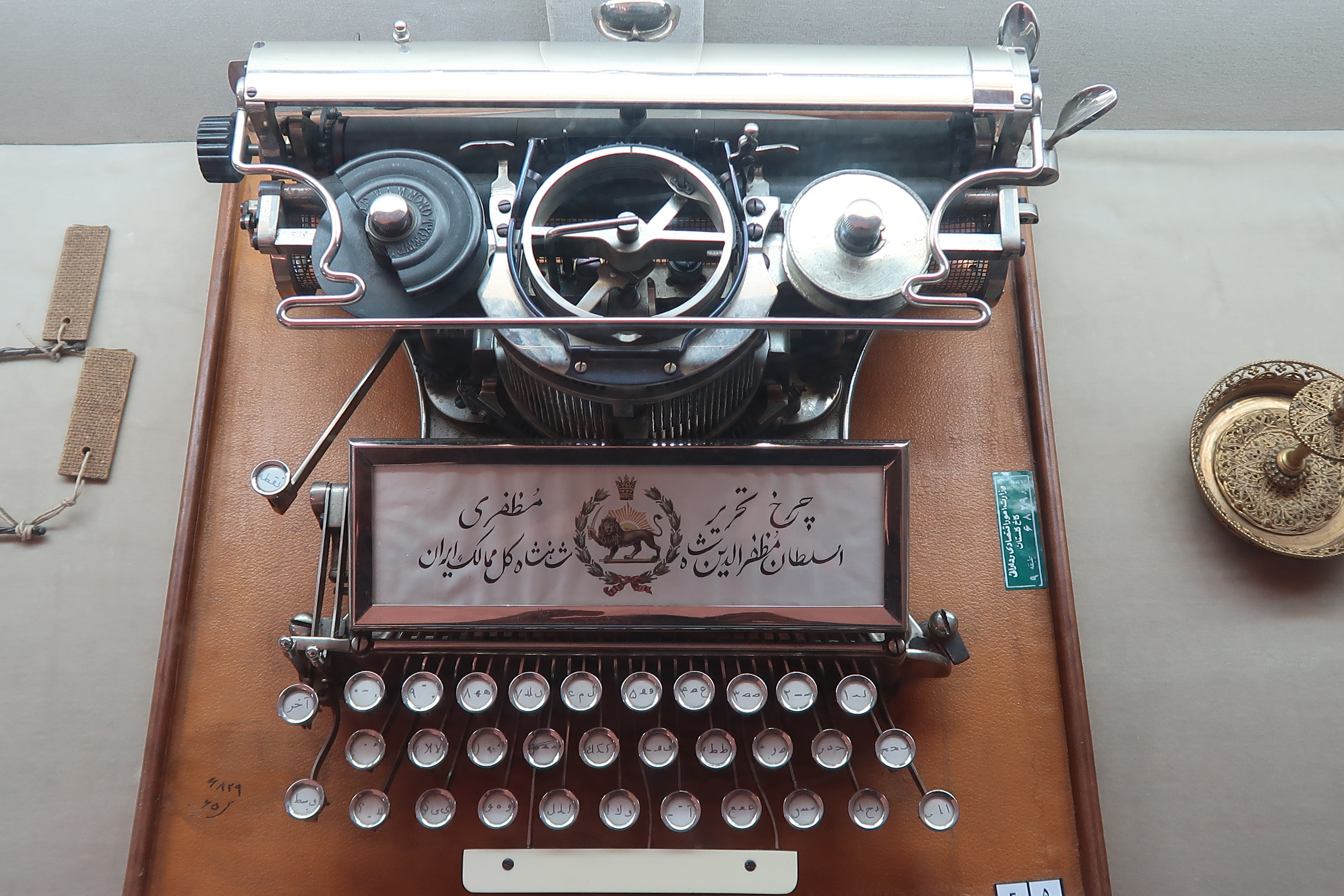
Personal typewriter of Mozaffar ad-Din Shah Qajar, the fifth Qajar king of Persia (Iran), made in late 19th century

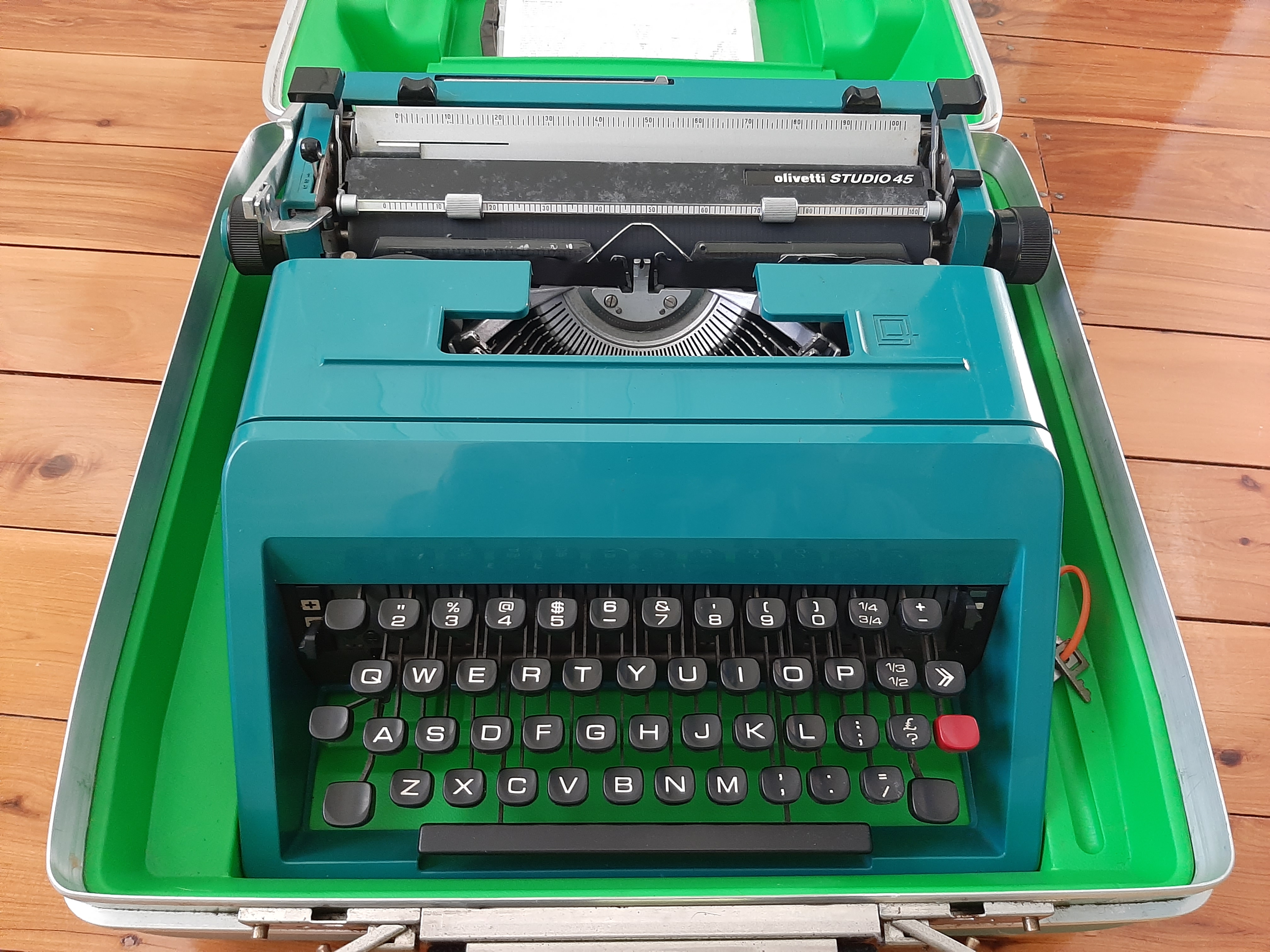
An Olivetti Studio 45 Typewriter

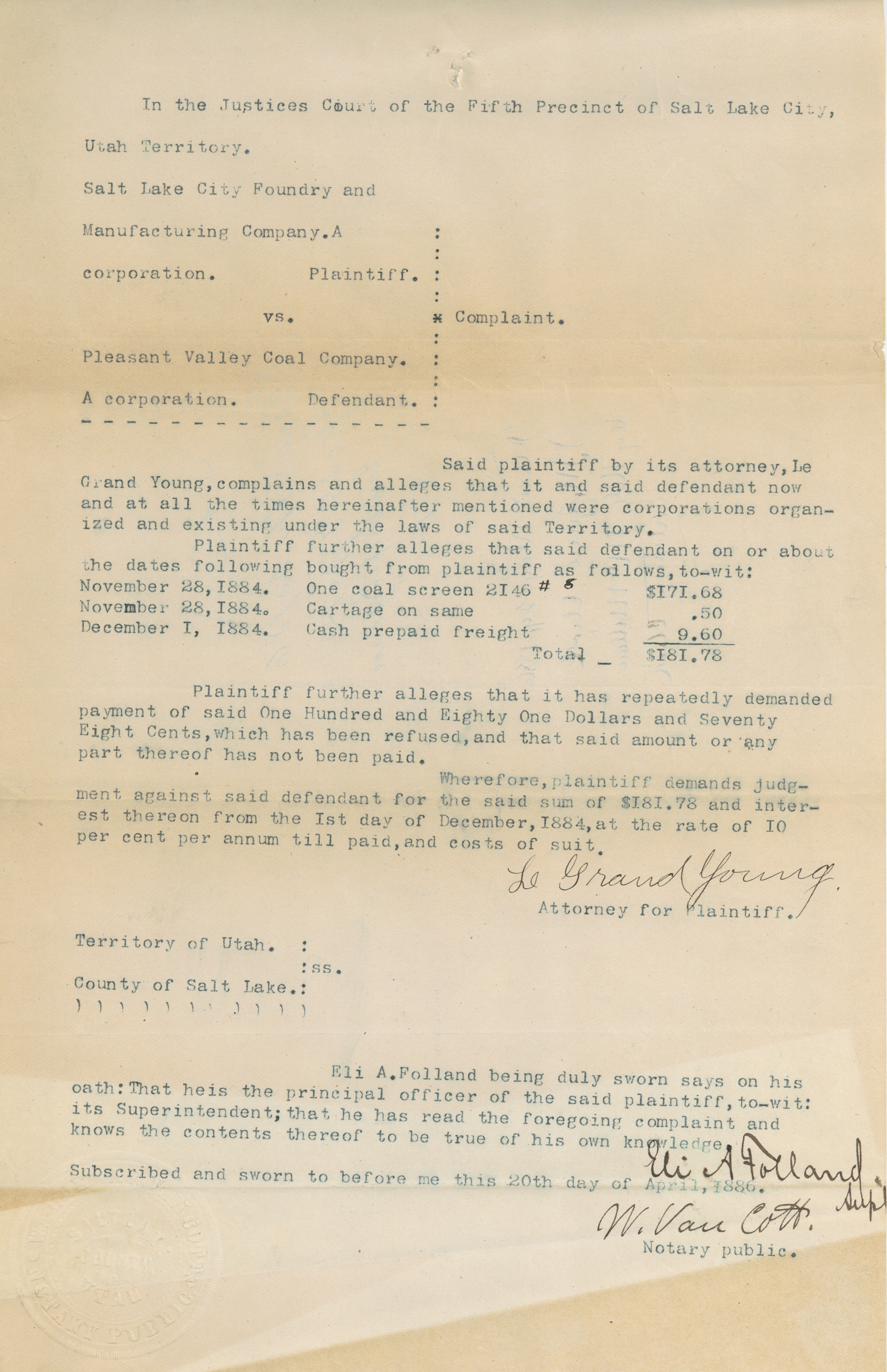
A very early typewritten letter as part of a court case in the Utah Territory, from Appeal #6544, dated 1886

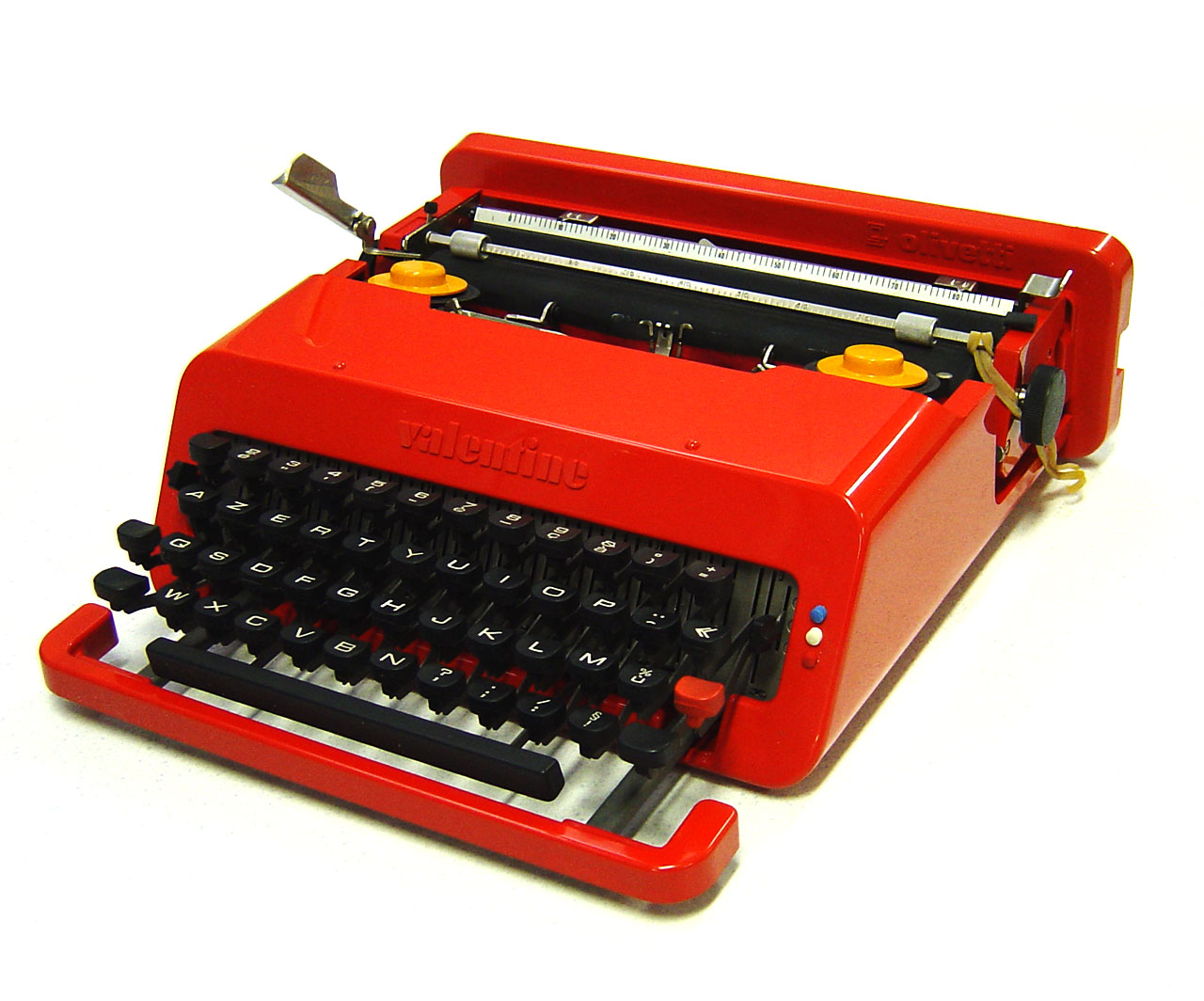
The 1969 Olivetti Valentine portable typewriter (Note: featured in the permanent collections of the Metropolitan Museum of Art, Museum of Modern Art, and Cooper Hewitt, Smithsonian Design Museum in New York; London's Design Museum and Victoria and Albert Museum)

== See also ==
- Chorded keyboard – Computer input device
- Computer keyboard – Data input device
- Duplicating machines – Machines to reproduce documents
- Friden Flexowriter – Teleprinter
- Letter (alphabet)
- Projection keyboard – Virtual device projected onto a surface
- Teletype Model 33 – 1963–1981 ASCII communications/computer terminal device
- Typeface – Set of characters that share common design features
- Typescript – Document written by hand
- Typewriter desk – Desk ergonomically designed for typists
