= Pattern (disambiguation) =

A pattern is an original object used to make copies, or a set of repeating objects in a decorative design and in other disciplines.

Pattern, patterns, or patterning may also refer to:

== Mathematics, science, and technology ==
=== Computing ===
- Software design pattern, a standard form for a solution to common problems in software design.
  - Architectural pattern, for software architecture
  - Interaction design pattern, used in interaction design / human-computer interaction
- Pattern recognition, in machine learning
- In machine learning, a non-null finite sequence of constant and variable symbols
- Regular expression, often called a pattern

=== Other ===
- Airfield traffic pattern, the traffic flow immediately surrounding a runway
- Design pattern, a standard form for a solution to common problems in design
  - Pattern book, a book of architectural designs
  - Pattern (architecture), a standard form (pattern language) for a solution to common problems in architecture
  - Software design pattern (see above)
- Pattern formation, the processes and mechanisms by which patterns such as the stripes of animals form; also, a science dealing with outcomes of self-organisation
- Pattern language, a structured method of describing good design practices
- Pattern theory, a mathematical formalism to describe knowledge of the world as patterns
- Patterns in nature, the visible regularities of form found in nature and explained by science
- Pedagogical patterns
- In ethnomethodology, a (generally non-rigid) routine

== Manufacturing ==
- Multiple patterning, a class of technologies for manufacturing integrated circuits
- Pattern (casting), a replica of the object to be cast
- Pattern coin, a coin struck to test a new design, alloy, or method of manufacture
- Pattern (sewing), the original garment, or a paper template, from which other garments are copied and produced

== Fiction ==
- Patterns (Kraft Television Theatre), a 1955 live television drama written by Rod Serling
- Patterns (film), a 1956 film based on the TV show
- Patterns, a 1989 novel by Pat Cadigan

== Music ==
- Patterns, a 1975 album by Kiki Dee
- Patterns (Bobby Hutcherson album), by Bobby Hutcherson, released in 1980
- Patterns (Kelsea Ballerini album), by Kelsea Ballerini, released in 2024
- Patterns (EP), an EP by Repeater
- Patterns, an alternative title of the Modern Jazz Quartet's album Music from Odds Against Tomorrow
- "Patterns" (Paul Simon song), 1965
- "Patterns", a polka song by "Weird Al" Yankovic
- "Patterns" (Small Faces song), 1967

== Other uses ==
- Pattern (devotional), in Irish Catholicism, the devotional practices associated with a patron saint
- Patterns II, a pencil and paper game designed by Sid Sackson
- Patterns (video game), a building game for personal computers
- Juggling pattern, a trick performed while juggling

== See also ==
- The Pattern (disambiguation)
- Pattrn, a media division of The Weather Channel that is focused on climate, sustainability, and environmental news
