= Sunburst =

Stylized design of the Sun commonly used in architectural ornaments and design patterns

One example of various sunburst designs

A sunburst is a design or figure commonly used in architectural ornaments and design patterns and possibly pattern books. It consists of rays or "beams" radiating outward from a central disk, in the manner of sunbeams. Sometimes part of a sunburst, a semicircular or semi-elliptical shape, is used.

Traditional sunburst motifs usually show the rays tapering as they extend further from the centre. From the later 19th century, the rays often flare instead, as in the Japanese Rising Sun Flag, which is more appropriate in optical terms.

In architecture, the sunburst is often used in window designs, including fanlights and rose windows, as well as in decorative motifs. The sunburst motif is characteristic of Baroque church metalwork, especially monstrances and votive crowns, and Art Deco and Art Nouveau styles as well as church architecture. A sunburst is frequently used in emblems, military decorations, and badges.

Sunbursts can appear in photographs when taking a picture of the Sun through the diaphragm of a lens set to a narrow aperture due to diffraction; the effect is often called a sunstar.

In information visualization, a sunburst chart or diagram is a multilevel pie chart used to represent the proportion of different values found at each level in a hierarchy.

== Badges ==
The sunburst was the badge of king Edward III of England, and has thus become the badge of office of Windsor Herald.

== Gallery ==
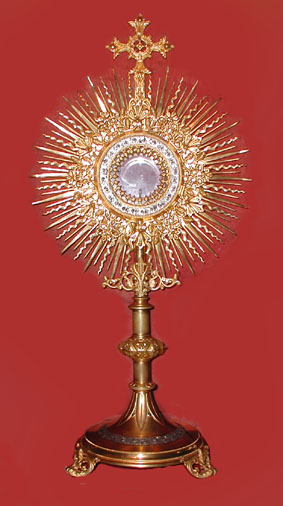
A traditional "solar" monstrance

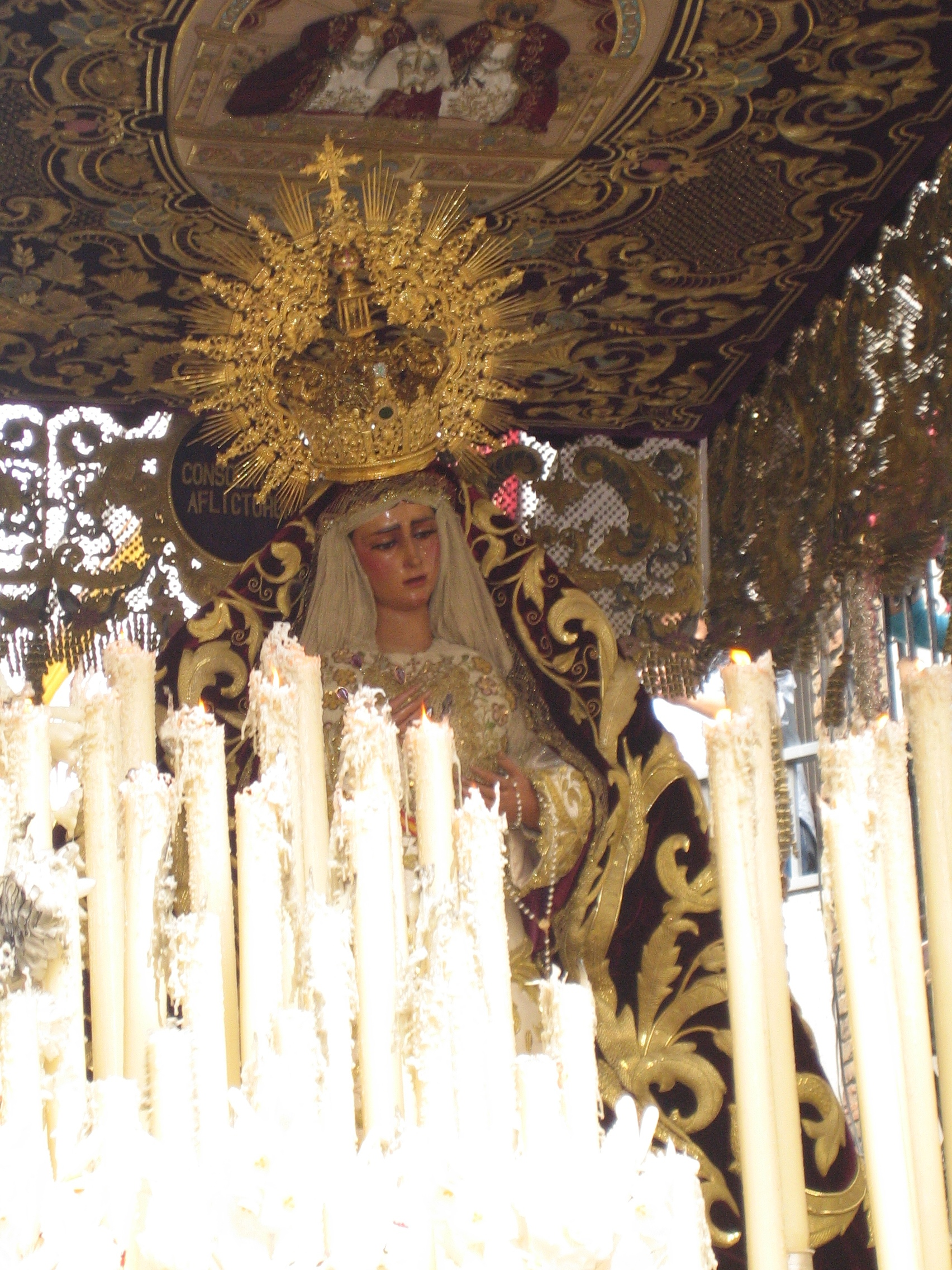
Baroque sunburst crown on a Spanish statue of the Virgin Mary

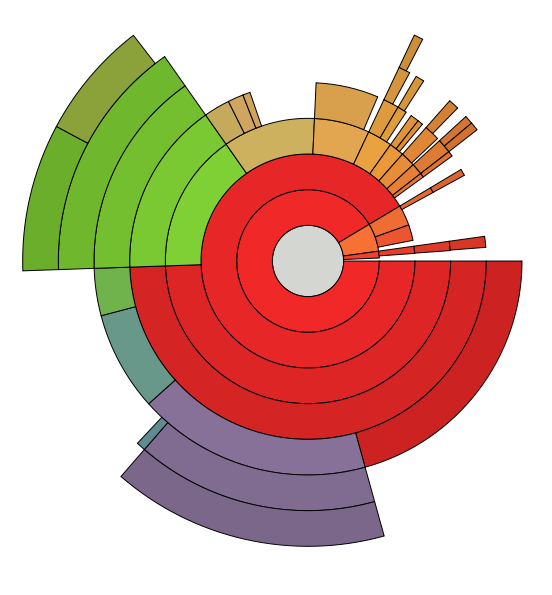
Sunburst chart representing disk usage in a file system

Flag of Argentina

War flag of the Imperial Japanese Army (army's version of the Rising Sun Flag)

Blue Sky with a White Sun, flag of the Chinese Nationalist Party

The Star of India, official emblem of British India

The flag of the Smithsonian Institution

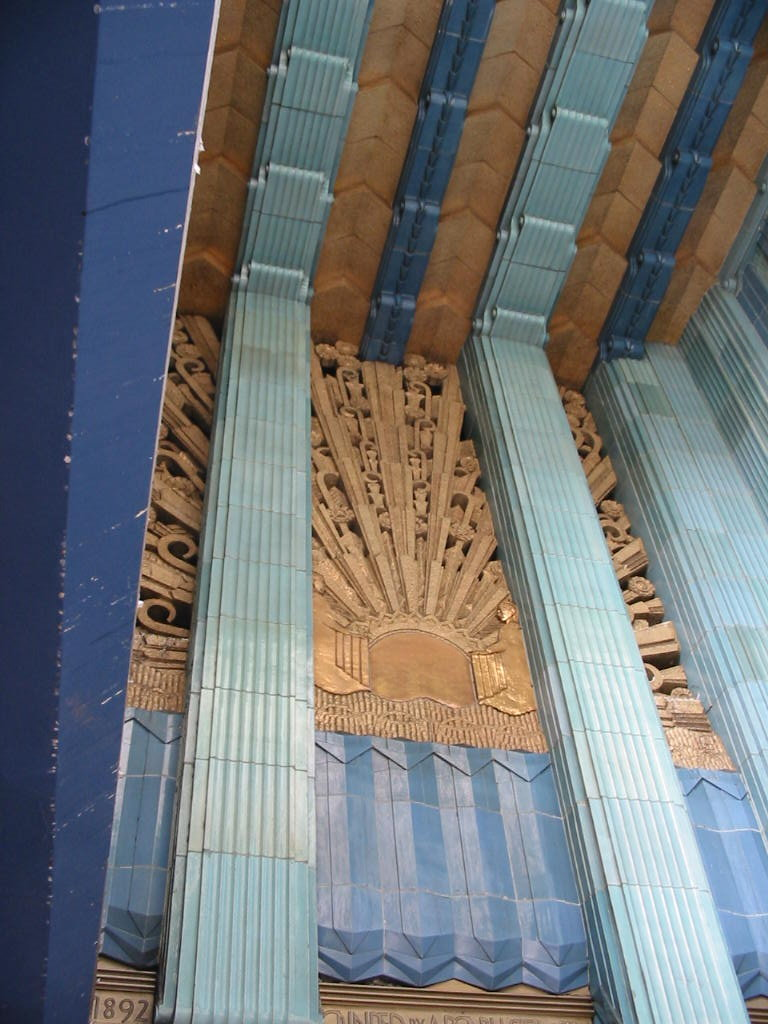
Terra cotta sunburst art deco design in gold at the Eastern Columbia Building in Los Angeles

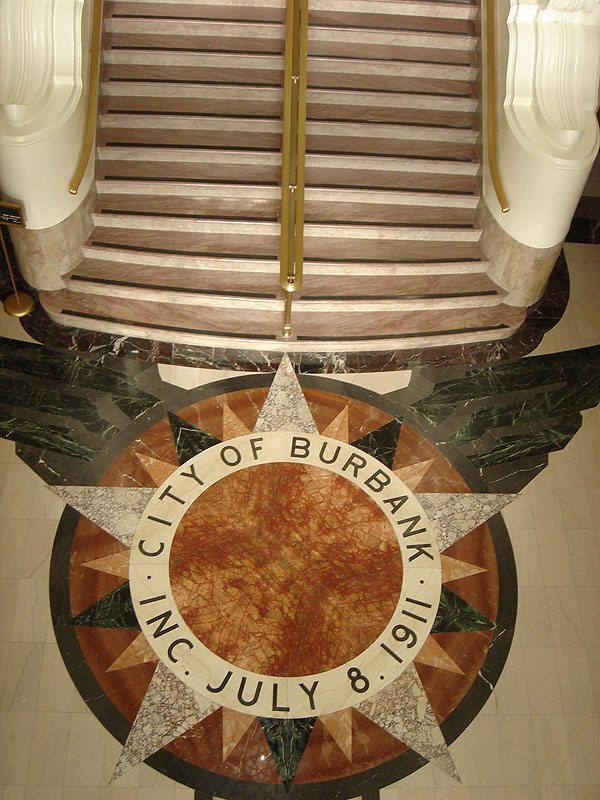
Bottom of stairs, Burbank City Hall, Burbank, California

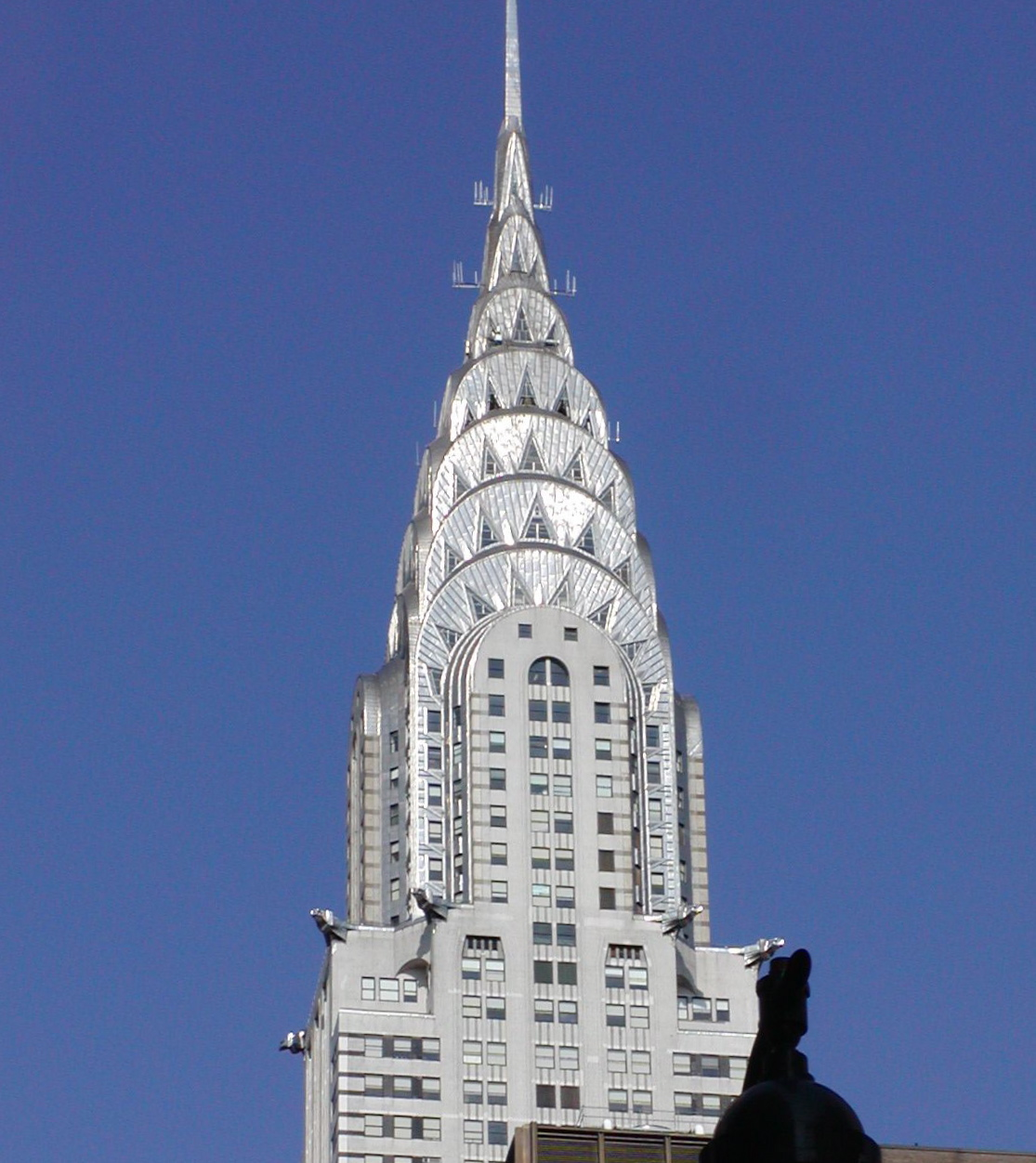
Chrysler Building top

Traditional Irish sunburst flag, used since the 18th century and associated with the mythical warriors, the Fianna

Modern sunburst flag, used by Irish nationalist groups

Flag of St. George, Utah, US.

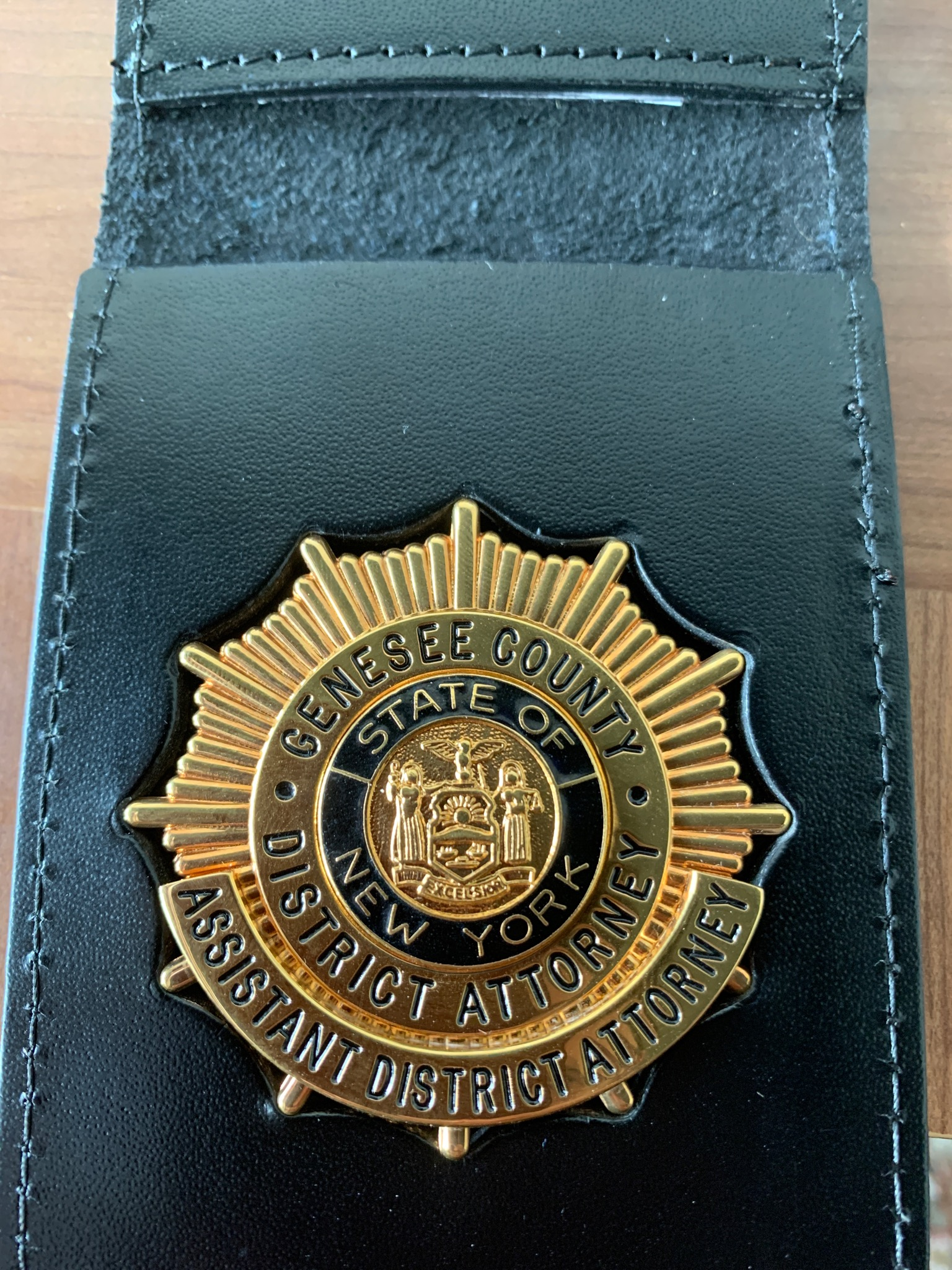
Sunburst on a badge.

== See also ==
- Solar symbol § Rayed depictions
