= Table data gateway =

Design pattern

Table Data Gateway is a design pattern in which an object acts as a gateway to a database table. The idea is to separate the responsibility of fetching items from a database from the actual usages of those objects. Users of the gateway are then insulated from changes to the way objects are stored in the database.
