= ...in the suburbs of Moscow =

Book of essays

«...in the suburbs of Moscow. From the History of Russian Manor Culture of the 17th–19th centuries» is a 1980 album-format book of essays on the 300-year history of the estates of the nobility of Moscow from their inception in the 16th century to their peak in the 18th century and decline by the end of the 19th century. The essays are dedicated to the study of the formation of their artistic image in relation to the lifestyle of their owners—in the unity of social demands, art, and nature.

The quality of illustrations and historical information gathered, some of which are published for the first time, has aroused the interest of a wide range of antiquities enthusiasts and specialists in a publication that has long since become a bibliographic rarity.

== General characteristics ==
=== Author team ===
- Editors: M. A. Anikst, V. S. Turchin Text
- Authors: V. S. Turchin, V. I. Sheredega
- Comments: V. S. Turchin, K. G. Bogemskaya
- Annotations: V. T. Shmakova
- Layout and design: M. A. Anikst
- Photographs: black and white—A. P. Dorofeev, color (based on sketches by M. A. Anikst)—E. I. Steynert

=== Content ===
Epigraph

As an epigraph, the editors used a quote from the memoirs of a participant in the foreign campaigns of the Russian army in the early 19th century A. F. Raevsky, who compared the beauties of the "beautiful suburbs of Moscow" to those of Europe. Enchanted by the views of the Moscow estates Kolomenskoye, Lyublino, Ostankino, Petrovsko-Razumovskoye, Sviblovo, Tsaritsyno, he lamented that there was no "description of all that deserves the attention of a patriot, ...of his own Virgil in Russia" and concluded: "My homeland! What has nature denied you? ...I thank Providence that I was born under the Russian sky!"

Raevsky A. F. Memoirs of the campaigns of 1813 and 1814: in 2 parts. – Moscow: Published by A. S. Shiryayev, 1822. – Part 2. – 120 pp. – pp. 96–106 With what inexplicable pleasure I spent several golden days of my life, enjoying the diverse beauty of nature and the power of art in the unique Tsaritsyno! ...The location of the garden, the wonderful, diverse views within it, modest and magnificent, on the elevated hills and in impenetrable thickets, on the shores of lakes and on flowering islands, scattered temples and pavilions, ancient ruins and huts, grottos and statues, the mirror surface of clear water, stirred by the lively oars of rowers, delightful groves and majestic alleys, meadows adorned with fragrant flowers, and impenetrable forests, in short, everything that nature has of exquisite beauty, and what art possesses of the beautiful—you will find everything in Tsaritsyno!
...The beautiful, pleasure-rich, and hospitable Lyublino, the proud Vorobyovy Hills, from which the vast Moscow appears in all its splendor and grandeur to the astonished gaze; quiet Ostankino, a refuge from the noise of the capital; delightful Sviblovo, a haven of taste and rural joys! Accept my gratitude for the sweet hours I spent so happily in your peaceful halls!
...Do you want to see everything that luxury, taste, and wealth can present as most delightful and majestic; follow me to Petrovskoe, belonging to Count L. K. Razumovsky. The magnificent abode of the owner majestically stands on a fragrant carpet of flowers. Everything that the kingdom of plants has that is rare, everything that can charm sight and smell, the most exquisite works of Phidias, the art of Le Nôtre—all captivates the spirit, and imagination involuntarily transports us to the charming abode of Artemis!
...Kolomenskoye has more beauties than all the attractive sights of Switzerland and the banks of the Rhine! ...From the church porch, a magnificent spectacle opens up: in the misty distance, the ancient capital of Russia, bright Moscow, lies at your feet; a multitude of villages, meadows, fields, and groves before your eyes create a most beautiful picture for the eyes, producing pleasant sensations in the heart and imagination!

In the introduction, the editors characterized the publication of essays on the legacy of well-known and obscure creators of Moscow's ensembles as a contribution to "a certain ideal, yet unwritten history of manor culture."

== Contents ==
- Chapter I. The Ancient Russian Country Estate of the 16th–17th Centuries
- Chapter II. The Baroque Era (First Half of the 18th Century)
- Chapter III. The Mid-18th Century
- Chapter IV. The Years of Flourishing for the Country Estates (1770–1812)
- Chapter V. The 19th Century in the Moscow Region

=== Annotations to the country estates ===
The annotations attached to the main text provide brief historical references and information about the status of nearly fifty estates, some of which are now located within the territory of Moscow.

The contribution of this publication to the study of country estate culture and its role in shaping the artistic and spiritual world has been noted in the works of researchers and art historians. According to them, the authors were the first in modern art history to show the evolution of views on the various facets of life in the estates, which, in the words of D. S. Likhachev, are "closely connected not only with the ideas and tastes of society but also with the way of life of their owners and the lifestyle of their contemporaries".

== Features of the printing execution ==
The publication was distinguished by its design and carefully selected illustrative material. The book contains 184 black-and-white and color illustrations—antique engravings, paintings, sculptures, design elements, and landscapes. The texts are printed on tinted "vergé" paper, and the photographs are printed on coated paper. The book is enclosed in a colorful publisher's case along with a separate brochure—a summary in English, French, and German. The print run of the book was made in Vienna.

With a circulation of 30,000 copies, this fundamental publication of essays on the architecture of Moscow region estates has long since become a bibliographic rarity.
