= Massing =

Perceived general shape and form of a building

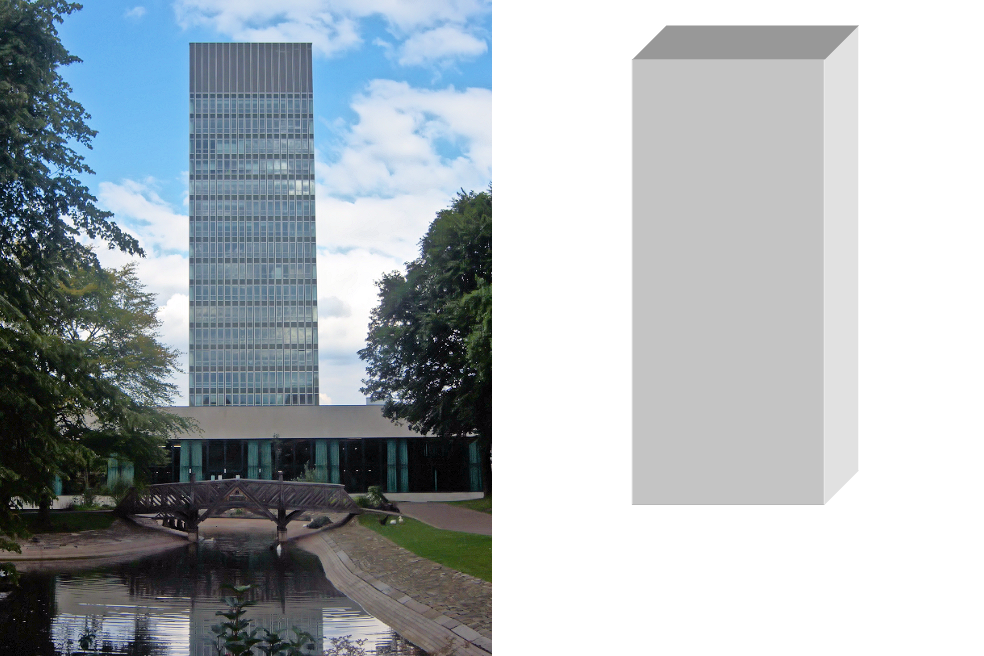
The Arts Tower in Sheffield, Britain, has a tall, lightweight, cuboid massing.

In architecture and design, massing is the arrangement of elements to convey the shape, form and size of a structure or product. The massing of a building influences the sense of space it encloses, and helps to define both the interior space and the exterior shape of the building.

== Characteristics ==
Massing is the three-dimensional form of an object or building, not just the outline or silhouette. The use of massing affects the perception of a structure, and can emphasize the importance of a particular component or articulate its usage, for example by identifying an entrance or conveying movement through a building. In product design, massing helps a user identify intuitively where the important parts are and how they are used.

Massing can be additive or a subtractive. Additive massing involves combining volumes or repeated units to create a larger form, emphasizing the individual pieces used to construct it. In contrast, subtractive or divisive massing involves removing parts of a larger, recognizable whole. Architects use massing models to depict the volume of a design and its relationship with the external space. Unlike other types of models like solid/void models and development models, massing models do not typically include openings or interior spaces.

It is generally held that architectural design begins by considering massing. From a distance, massing, more than any architectural detail, is what creates the most impact on the eye. Architectural details or ornaments may serve to reinforce or minimize massing. Massing can also be significantly altered by the materials used for the building's exterior, as transparent, reflective, or layered materials are perceived differently. Because it has a direct relation to the visual impact a building makes, massing is one of the most important architectural design considerations.

Massing can be impacted by laws, codes, and regulations such as setback requirements and limits on height.

Massing also has an effect on building energy efficiency. A complex shape can present more opportunities for heat loss through the building envelope. Reducing the number of exterior walls, along with a low vertical surface area to floor area ratio (VFAR) decreases heat loss potential.

Some architectural styles are closely associated with massing. For example, the Prairie School is always low and horizontal, while the Gothic style emphasizes verticality, and Georgian architecture focuses on solidity and a sense of permanence.
