= Shape and form (visual arts) =

Difination of form

In the visual arts, shape is a flat, enclosed area of an artwork created through lines, textures, or colours, or an area enclosed by other shapes, such as triangles, circles, and squares. Likewise, a form can refer to a three-dimensional composition or object within a three-dimensional composition.

Specifically, it is an enclosed space, the boundaries of which are defined by other elements of art. Shapes are limited to two dimension: length and width.

== Form ==
A form is an artist's way of using elements of art, principles of design, and media. Form, as an element of art, is three-dimensional and encloses space. Like a shape, a form has length and width, but it also has depth. Forms are either geometric or free-form, and can be symmetrical or asymmetrical.

== Categories ==
=== Geometric and organic ===
Geometric shapes are precise edged and mathematically consistent curves, they are pure forms and so consist of circles, squares, spirals, triangles, while geometric forms are simple volumes, such as cubes, cylinders, and pyramids. They generally dominate architecture, technology, industry and crystalline structures.

In contrast, organic shapes are free-form, unpredictable, and flowing in appearance. These shapes and organic forms visually suggest the natural world of animals, plants, sky, sea, etc... The addition of organic shapes to a composition dominated by geometric structures can add unpredictable energy.

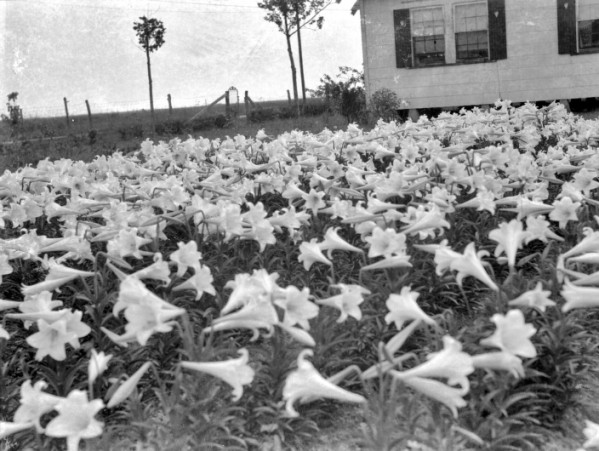
Bell-shaped flowers

=== Positive and negative ===
A positive shape is a shape, that has details inside it, such as an outline of a human, with body features. Contrarily, a negative shape is a shape without any details; it's just an outline.

=== Representation ===
A shape that is representative is created by the flattening out of three-dimensional objects. Nothing is actually geometric, but can be interpreted as such by breaking it down to shapes that, when put together, form a recognizable silhouette.

== See also ==
- Elements of art
- Composition (visual arts)
- Constructive geometry
- Design elements and design principles
