= Lucas Tirigall Caste =

Lucas Tirigall Caste (born 1974 in Buenos Aires, Argentina), also known as Lucas TC, is considered one of Argentina's leading multimedia artists and pioneer in digital media who is recognized for his talents intertwining creative disciplines such as music and visual design through programmatic environments. Lucas studied audio-visual design on the Faculty of Architecture, Design and Urbanism. He is the author of “Evolutionary Art” (2004) and co-founder of the artist marketplace Society6 (2009).

== Biography ==
Lucas began his artistic career in 1994 as an audiovisual designer and creative editor. His work won international fame in 1999 when he became the most famous Argentine on the Web under the pseudonym Lucas TC. He became not only the most listened to Argentine artist around the world but also one of the most legally-downloaded artists worldwide with his debut album totaling more than 1,800.000 downloads.
