= Commercial art (disambiguation) =

Commercial art may refer to:

- Commercial art
- Applied arts
- Visual communication
- Communication design
