= Erasing shield =

Hand tool for controlling erasure of marks from paper

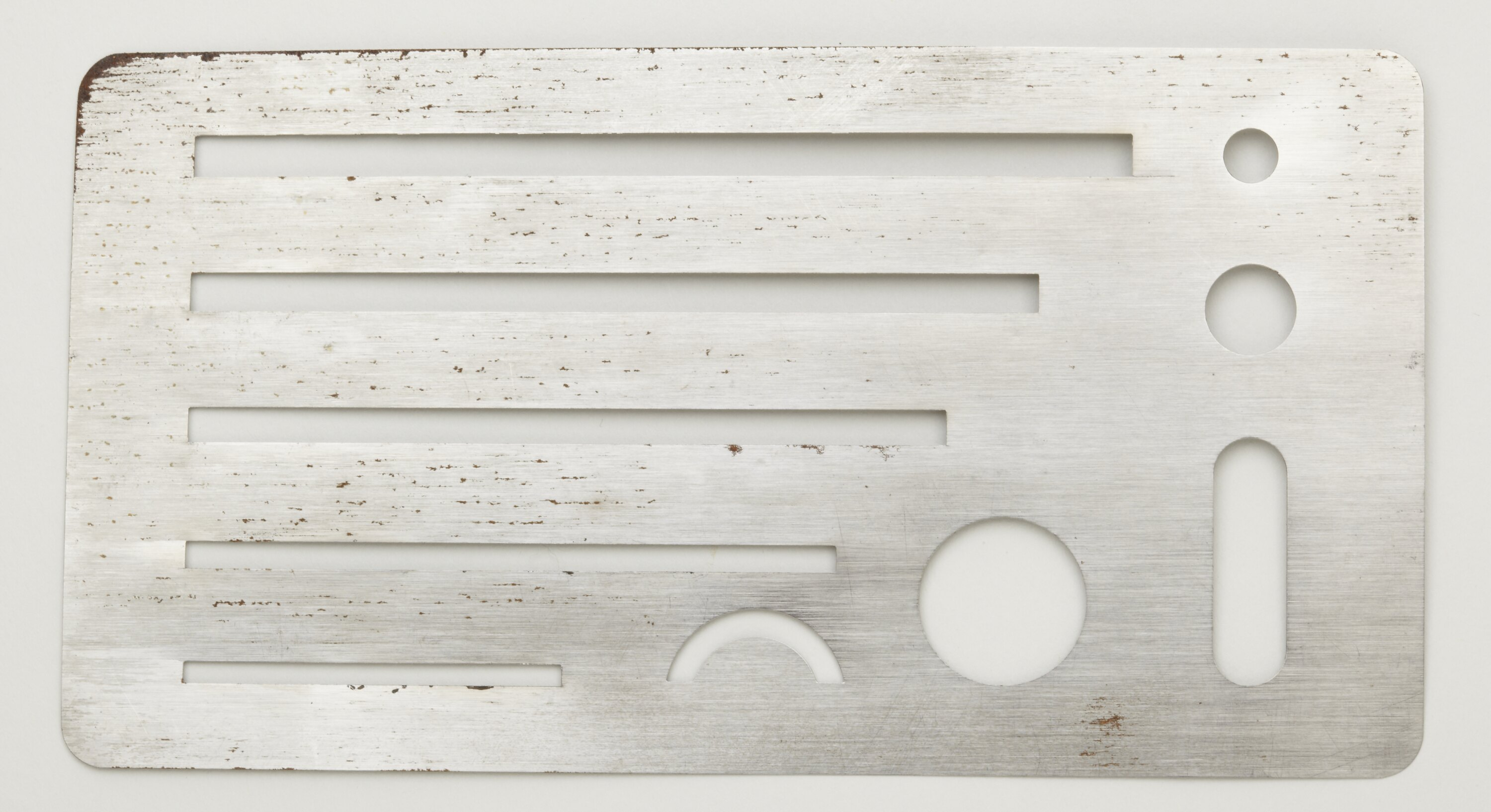
An early 20th-century stainless steel eraser shield.

An erasing shield, eraser shield, or erasure shield is a thin template or mask used to control the effects of an eraser, typically on paper media used by an artist, calligrapher, drafter, or typist. The tool is made of a thin, flexible material such as transparent plastic, or stainless steel shim stock for durability. A number of narrow, straight or curved apertures have been punched out of the shield, similar to a drafting template or drawing stencil. The openings allow the eraser to work in a controlled fashion, while protecting masked areas of the paper from being erased or smeared.

Erasing shields can also be used to draw evenly-spaced dashed lines, or as a simple stencil.

Erasing shields were common accessories used with a typewriter to ease the correction of mistakes, especially on carbon copies, which were prone to smearing if not erased carefully. Typewriters are less used today, but artists continue to use erasing shields when working directly on erasable paper media, such as pencil drawings, charcoal drawings, or pastels.
