= The Pattern =

The Pattern may refer to:

- The Pattern (band), an American punk garage rock band
- The Pattern (The Chronicles of Amber), an inscribed labyrinth which gives the multiverse its order in The Chronicles of Amber
- The Pattern (Fringe), a series of occurrences in the television series Fringe

== See also ==
- Pattern (disambiguation)
