= Pattern gardening =

Pattern gardening is a method of designing gardens influenced by the concepts of design pattern and pattern language originated by Christopher Alexander. It reflects the archetypal patterns of garden making, based on proportions and how the senses react. Patterns give coherence to garden design and communicate creativity and aesthetics.

Specific elements are instinctively looked for in a garden. Working with these elements is the basis for all good garden design. Each such element, or pattern, is archetypal, and therefore any pattern can be easily adapted to any garden situation. The fourteen pattern elements are:

- Scale, which relates the garden to the environment;
- Garden rooms, which divide and connect the garden;
- Pathways, which define what we see in the garden;
- Bridges, which differentiate garden spaces and create compelling focal points;
- Gates, which are the portal to the garden;
- Shelters, which anchor the garden in space;
- Borders, which separate and make distinct garden sections;
- Patios, which tie the house to the landscape;
- Sheds, which add texture;
- Focal points, which create destinations in the garden;
- Water, which fully engages the senses;
- Ornamentation, which creates mood;
- Containers, which allow artistic flexibility; and,
- Materials, which add bulk, solidity, and softness to the garden.
