= Line (graphics) =

In graphics, narrow field between two points

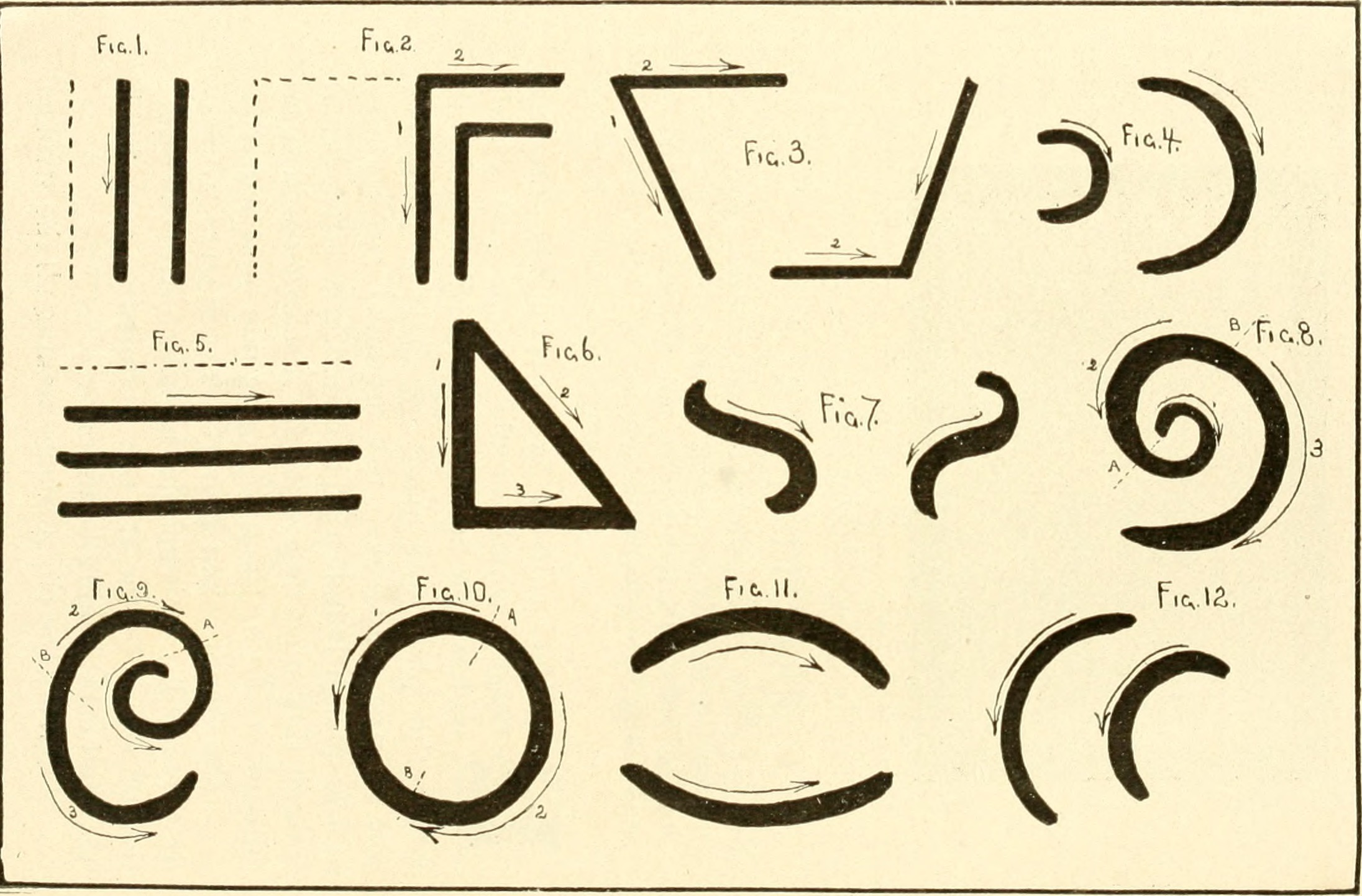
A variety of straight and curved lines, practice exercises from a book on signage design

In graphics, a line can be described as a single point that continues for a distance, or as the connection between two points. The purpose of a line in graphics is to help the artist to communicate to the viewers what it is they are supposed to be seeing or taking notice of. Line is one of the main components of design including principles such as shape, color, texture, value, perspective, and form. Lines can appear in many different forms, including straight or curved, continuous or dotted, thick or thin, and real or implied. Line can be used to create structure and tone in illustrations and other artworks.

== Scope ==
One of the main uses of lines is in the separation of borders in a work. It is commonly used in illustrations as a way to help viewers distinguish a subject’s edges or boundaries and to create individual shapes. The use of lines, or outlining, to create a sense of shape is most commonly used in cartoon style illustrations or animations.

Another use of line in graphics is the ability to help suggest a tone or feeling in a work. Vertical lines can be used to create a sense of strength or stability. An example of this could be a row of trees in a picture creating a series of vertical lines. Horizontal lines can be used to create a feeling of calm, peace or passiveness. An example of this may be the border between a lake and the shore in a painting creating the appearance of a horizontal line. Diagonal lines can be used to create a sense of excitement or drama. An example of this may be something that appears offset in an artwork that creates a feeling of interest or energy.

One other use of line is to intentionally lead the viewers eyes to what the artist wants them to see. A viewer’s eyes will naturally follow a line to where it is leading, and so an artist can utilize lines to help lead the viewer to the subject of most importance, or to pull the viewer around a picture.

== Formats ==
Solid line
Dotted line
Dashed line

Lines in graphic design do not always have to be straight lines and can come in many different shapes. They can appear as a rectilinear, or straight, or in a curvilinear, or curved, form. Straight lines are often used to help communicate the tone of the artwork. Curved lines are often used to help lead the viewer's eye around a work. Both are commonly used in the creation of individual shapes or objects.

Lines may also vary in length and width. Anything longer than an individual point may be considered a line and lines can continue indefinitely. Any line that is thin enough to not be considered a single point or dot however thick may also still be considered a line. Utilizing different lengths and widths in a work can create a sense of variety and can make a piece of art appear more interesting,

A line may not always be continuous, broken or implied lines are also commonly used in graphics. A series of dots or dashes can still be a line, because it can still be used to fulfill the purpose of a regular unbroken line. An implied line is something that directs the viewer’s eye to a particular point in space without actually using a real line. An example of an implied line may be the subject pointing at something, the subjects arrayed in a way that leads to a single point, or the eyes or gaze of a subject or subjects in the work looking at a particular point of interest leading the viewer to look at what is being pointed at.

== Applications ==
- In road surface marking, line formats convey different traffic regulations
- In illustrations, to create borders
- In artworks, to imply a tone or create excitement
