= Pedagogical pattern =

Re-usable form of a solution to a problem or task in pedagogy

A pedagogical pattern is the re-usable form of a solution to a problem or task in pedagogy, analogous to how a design pattern is the re-usable form of a solution to a design problem. Pedagogical patterns are used to document and share best practices of teaching. A network of interrelated pedagogical patterns is an example of a pattern language.

== Overview ==
In a 2001 paper for SIGCSE, Joseph Bergin wrote:

A pattern is supposed to capture best practice in some domain. Pedagogical patterns try to capture expert knowledge of the practice of teaching. [...] The intent [of pedagogical patterns] is to capture the essence of the practice in a compact form that can be easily communicated to those who need the knowledge. Presenting this information in a coherent and accessible form can mean the difference between every new instructor needing to relearn what is known by senior faculty and easy transference of knowledge of teaching within the community.

== Example structure of a pattern ==
Mitchell Weisburgh proposed nine aspects to documenting a pedagogical pattern for a certain skill. Not every pattern needs to include all nine. His listing is reproduced below:

- Name – single word or short phrase that refers to the pattern. This allows for rapid association and retrieval.
- Problem – definition of a problem, including its intent or a desired outcome, and symptoms that would indicate that this problem exists.
- Context – preconditions which must exist in order for that problem to occur; this is often a situation. When forces conflict, the resolutions of those conflicts is often implied by the context.
- Forces – description of forces or constraints and how they interact. Some of the forces may be contradictory. For example: being thorough often conflicts with time or money constraints.
- Solution – instructions, possibly including variants. The solution may include pictures, diagrams, prose, or other media.
- Examples – sample applications and solutions, analogies, visual examples, and known uses can be especially helpful, help user understand the context
- Resulting Context – result after the pattern has been applied, including postconditions and side effects. It might also include new problems that might result from solving the original problem.
- Rationale – the thought processes that would go into selecting this pattern, The rationale includes an explanation of why this pattern works, how forces and constraints are resolved to construct a desired outcome.
- Related Patterns – differences and relationships with other patterns, possibly predecessor, antecedents, or alternatives that solve similar problems.

== See also ==
- Modeling (psychology)
- Teacher education
- Teaching method
- Pedagogical content knowledge
