= Communication design =

Academic discipline

Communication design is a mixed discipline between design and information-development concerned with how media communicates with people. A communication design approach is concerned with developing the message and aesthetics in media. It also creates new media channels to ensure the message reaches the target audience. Due to overlapping skills, some designers use graphic design and communication design interchangeably.

Communication design can also refer to a systems-based approach, in which the totality of media and messages within a culture or organization are designed as a single integrated process rather than a series of discrete efforts. This is done through communication channels that aim to inform and attract the attention of the target audience. Design skills must be used to create content suitable for different cultures and to maintain a pleasurable visual design. These are crucial pieces of a successful media communications kit.

Within the Communication discipline, the emerging framework for Communication as Design focuses on redesigning interactivity and shaping communication affordances. Software and applications create opportunities for and place constraints on communication. Recently, Guth and Brabham examined the way that ideas compete within a crowdsourcing platform, providing a model for the relationships among design ideas, communication, and platform. The same authors have interviewed technology company founders about the democratic ideals they build into the design of e-government applications and technologies. Interest in the Communication as Design framework continues growing among researchers.

== Overview ==
Communication design seeks to attract, inspire, and motivate people to respond to messages and to make favorable impact. This impact oriented toward the objectives of the commissioning body, which can be either to build a brand or move sales. It can also range from changing behaviors, to promoting a message, to disseminating information. The process of communication design involves strategic business thinking, including using market research, creativity, problem-solving, and technical skills and knowledge such as colour theory, page layout, typography, and creating visual hierarchies. Communication designers translate ideas and information through a variety of media. In order to establish credibility and influence audiences through the communication, communication designers use both traditional tangible skills and the ability to think strategically in design and marketing terms.

The term communication design is often used interchangeably with visual communication, but it maintains a broader meaning that includes auditory, vocal, touch, and olfactory senses. Examples of communication design practices include information architecture, editing, typography, illustration, web design, animation, advertising, ambient media, visual identity design, performing arts, copywriting and professional writing skills applied in the creative industries.

== Education ==
Students of communication design learn to create visual messages for distribution to an audience. Communication design has become a common way of reaching a target audience in the digital environment, and it has expanded its focus beyond user experience to user networks. Students learn to combine communication with art and technology. The discipline includes designing web pages, video games, animation, motion graphics, and more.

Communication Design has content as its main purpose. It must achieve a reaction, or get a customer to see a product in a genuine way to attract sales or effectively communicate a message. Communication design students are often Illustrators, Graphic Designers, Web designers, Advertising artists, Animators, Video Editors, Motion graphic artists, Printmakers, and Conceptual Artists. The term communications design is fairly general considering its interdisciplinary practitioners operate within various mediums to get a message across.

== Subdisciplines ==
- Advertising
- Art direction
- Brand management
- Content strategy
- Copywriting
- Creative direction
- Graphic design
- Illustration
- Industrial design
- Information architecture
- Information graphics
- Instructional design
- Marketing communications
- Performing arts
- Presentation
- Technical writing
- Visual arts

=== Visual communication design ===
Visual communication design is the design working in any media or support of visual communication. This is considered by some to be more accurate alternative terminology to cover all types of design applied in communication. It uses a visual channel for message transmission, reflecting the visual language inherent to some media. Unlike the terms graphic design (graphics) or interface design (electronic media), it is not limited to support a particular form of content.

=== Print media design ===
Print media design is a graphic design discipline that creates designs for printed media. Print design involves the creation of flyers, brochures, book covers, t-shirt prints, business cards, booklets, bookmarks, envelope designs, signs, letterheads, posters, CD cover, print media design templates, and more. The goal of print design is to use visual graphics to communicate a specific message to viewers.

== See also ==
- Design elements
- Design principles
- Communication studies
- Swiss Style (design)
