= Design elements =

Design elements are the foundation of any visual design. These include color, line, shape, texture, space, form and value.

== Color ==
Color is the result of light reflecting back from an object to our eyes. The color that our eyes perceive is determined by the pigment of the object itself. Color theory and the color wheel are often referred to when studying color combinations in visual design. Color is often deemed to be an important element of design as it is a universal language which presents the countless possibilities of visual communication. Color serves various purposes to contribute to the overall effectiveness of the design. It is used as an element to convey meaning and emotion, create visual hierarchy, enhance brand identity, improve readability and accessibility, create visual interest and appeal, differentiate information and elements, and make cultural and contextual significance.

Hue, saturation, and brightness are the three characteristics that describe color.

- Hue can simply be referred to as "color" as in red, yellow, or green.

=== Color theory in visual design ===
Color theory studies color mixing and color combinations. It is one of the first things that marked a progressive design approach. In visual design, designers refer to color theory as a body of practical guidance to achieving certain visual impacts with specific color combinations. Theoretical color knowledge is implemented in designs in order to achieve a successful color design.

==== Color harmony ====
Color harmony, often referred to as a "measure of aesthetics", studies which color combinations are harmonious and pleasing to the eye, and which color combinations are not. Color harmony is a main concern for designers given that colors always exist in the presence of other colors in form or space.

When a designer harmonizes colors, the relationships among a set of colors are enhanced to increase the way they complement one another. Colors are harmonized to achieve a balanced, unified, and aesthetically pleasing effect for the viewer.

Color harmony is achieved in a variety of ways, some of which consist of combining a set of colors that share the same hue, or a set of colors that share the same values for two of the three color characteristics (hue, saturation, brightness). Color harmony can also be achieved by simply combining colors that are considered compatible with one another as represented in the color wheel.

==== Color contrasts ====
Color contrasts are studied with a pair of colors, as opposed to color harmony, which studies a set of colors. In color contrasting, two colors with perceivable differences in aspects, such as luminance or saturation, are placed side by side to create contrast.

Johannes Itten presented seven kinds of color contrasts: contrast of light and dark, contrast of hue, contrast of temperature, contrast of saturation, simultaneous contrast, contrast of sizes, and contrast of complementary. These seven kinds of color contrasts have inspired past works involving color schemes in design.

==== Color schemes ====
Color schemes are defined as the set of colors chosen for a design. They are often made up of two or more colors that look appealing beside one another, and that create an aesthetic feeling when used together. Color schemes depend on color harmony as they point to which colors look pleasing beside one another.

A satisfactory design product is often accompanied by a successful color scheme. Over time, color design tools with the function of generating color schemes were developed to facilitate color harmonizing for designers.

=== Use of color in visual design ===
- Color is used to create harmony, balance, and visual comfort in a design.
- Color is used to evoke the desired mood and emotion in the viewer.
- Color is used to create a theme in the design.
- Color holds meaning and can be symbolic. In certain cultures, different colors can have different meanings.
- Color is used to put emphasis on desired elements and create visual hierarchy in a piece of art.
- Color can create identity for a certain brand or design product.
- Color allows viewers to have different interpretations of visual designs. The same color can evoke different emotions, or have various meanings to different individuals and cultures.
- Color strategies are used for organization and consistency in a design product.
- In the architectural design of a retail environment, colors affect decision-making, making which motivates consumers to buy particular products.
- Color strengthens narrative and storytelling in visual design.
- Color can represent characters, themes, and symbolism.
- Color is a tool that designers use to strategically add layers of meaning and subtext to their designs.
- Colors can create recurring visual motifs in a design, strengthening ideas and fostering coherence.
- Color is an effective tool for communication because it allows for complex interpretation and expression.

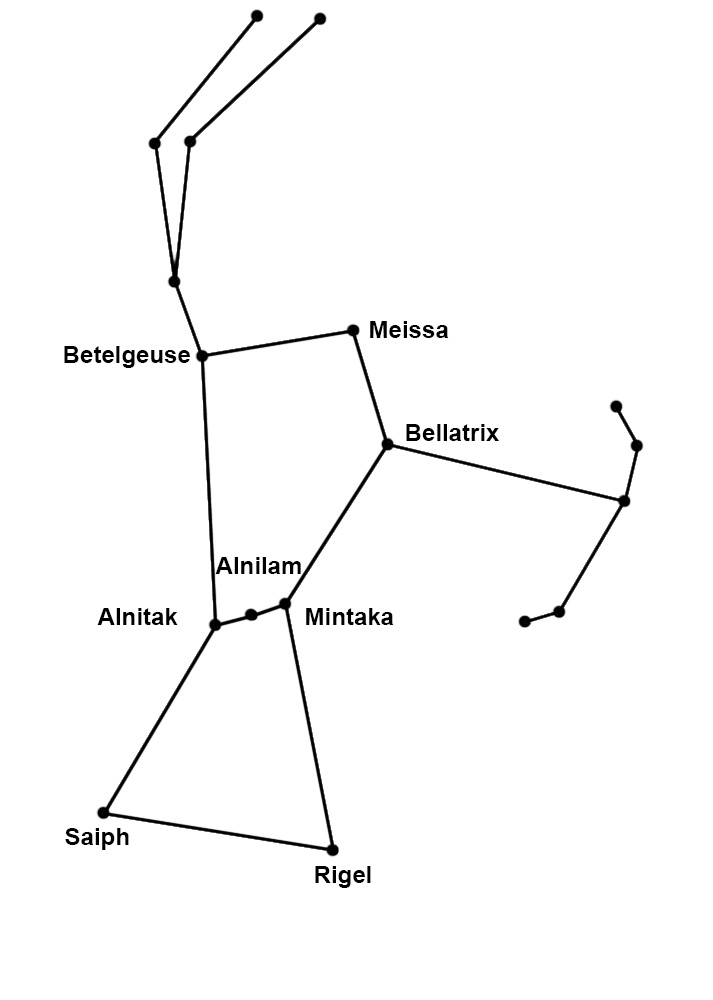
Similarly, stars in a constellation connected via imaginary lines are a natural example of using lines in a composition

== Line ==
A line is defined as a series of points, or the connection between two points, or the path of a moving point. The importance of line comes from its versatility as its characteristics are significantly expressive. Lines may also appear as linear shapes that take on a line-link quality, or as suggested line perceived from eyes as they follow a sequence related shapes. Line may be used either in two-dimensional forms with enclosing a space as an outline and creating shape, or in three-dimensional forms. On top of that, there are different types of lines aside from the ones previously mentioned. For example, you could have a line that is horizontal and zigzagged or a line that is vertical and zigzagged. Different lines create different moods, it all depends on what mood you are using line to create and convey.

== Point ==
A point is basically the beginning of “something” in “nothing." It forces the mind to think upon its position and gives something to build upon in both imagination and space. Some abstract points in a group can provoke human imagination to link it with familiar shapes or forms.

== Shape ==
Shapes are recognizable objects and forms and are usually composed of other elements of design.

For example, a square that is drawn on a piece of paper is considered a shape. It is created with a series of lines which serve as a boundary that shapes the square and separates it from the space around it that is not part of the square.

=== Types of shapes ===
Organic shapes are irregular shapes that are often complex and resemble shapes that are found in nature. Organic shapes can be drawn by hand, which is why they are sometimes subjective and only exist in the imagination of the artist.

Curvilinear shapes are composed of curved lines and smooth edges. They give off a more natural feeling to the shape. In contrast, rectilinear shapes are composed of sharp edges and right angles, and give off a sense of order in the composition. They look more human-made, structured, and artificial. Artists can choose to create a composition that revolves mainly around one of these styles of shape, or they can choose to combine both.

== Texture ==
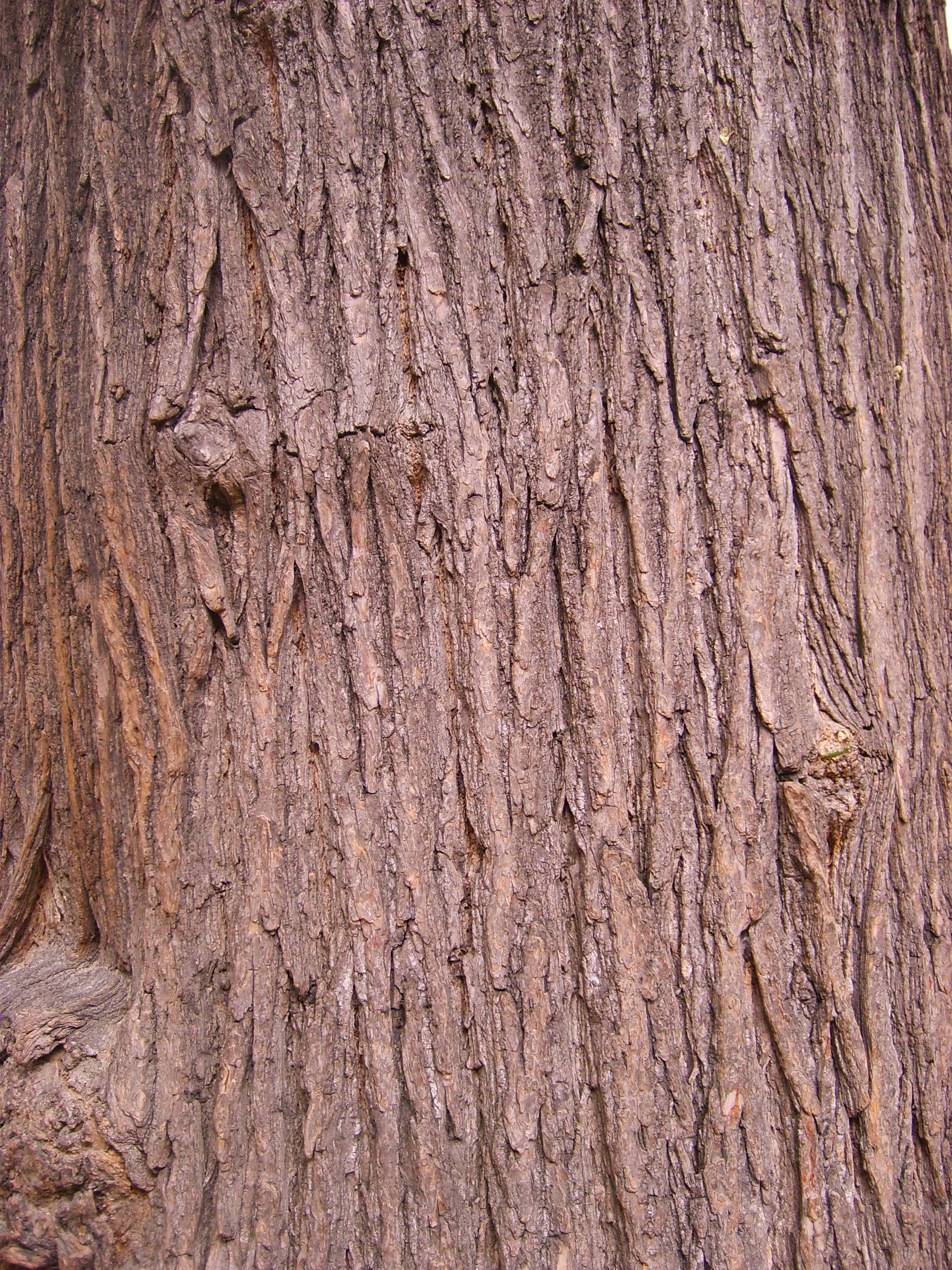
This is only a two dimensional image of a tree, but appears to have the texture of three dimensional bark.

Texture refers to the physical and visual qualities of a surface.

=== Definition of texture ===
Texture is the variation of data at a scale smaller than the scale of the main object. Taking a person wearing a Hawaiian shirt as an example, as long as we consider the person as the main object looking at, the patterns of their shirt are considered as texture. However, if we try to identify the pattern of the shirt, each flower or bird of the pattern is a non-textured object, as no smaller detail inside of it can be recognized. Texture in our environment helps us to better understand the nature of things, as a smooth paved road signals safe passage and thick fog creates a veil on our view.

=== Texture in design ===
Texture in design includes the literal physical surface employed in a printed piece as well as the optical appearance of the surface. Physical texture affects how the piece feels in hand and also how it conveys the design, as a glossy surface for example reflects the light differently than a soft or pebbly one. Many of the textures manipulated by graphic designers, however, cannot be physically experienced as it is utilized in the visual representation aspect of the design. Texture adds detail to an image in a way that conveys the overall quality of a surface. Graphic designers use texture to establish a mood, reinforce a point of view, or convey a sense of physical presence whether setting a type or drawing a tree.

==== Uses of texture in design ====
- Texture can also be used to add complex detail into the composition of a design.
- In theatrical design, the surface qualities of a costume sculpt the look and feel of a character, which influences the way the audience reacts to the character.

=== Types of texture ===
Tactile texture, also known as "actual texture," refers to the physical three-dimensional texture of an object. Tactile texture can be perceived by the sense of touch. A person can feel the tactile texture of a sculpture by running their hand over its surface and feelings its ridges and dents.

- Texture can be created through collage. This is when artists assemble three dimensional objects and apply them onto a two-dimensional surface, like a piece of paper or canvas, to create one final composition.
- Papier collé is another collaging technique in which artists glue paper to a surface to create different textures on its surface.
- Assemblage is a technique that consists of assembling various three-dimensional objects into a sculpture, which can also reveal textures to the viewer.

Visual texture, also referred to as "implied texture," is not detectable by our sense of touch, but by our sense of sight. Visual texture is the illusion of a real texture on a two-dimensional surface. Any texture perceived in an image or photograph is a visual texture. A photograph of rough tree bark is considered a visual texture. It creates the impression of a real texture on a two-dimensional surface which would remain smooth to the touch no matter how rough the represented texture is.

In painting, different paints are used to achieve different types of textures. Paints such as oil, acrylic, and encaustic are thicker and more opaque and are used to create three-dimensional impressions on the surface. Other paints, such as watercolor, tend to be used for visual textures, because they are thinner and have transparency, and do not leave much tactile texture on the surface.

=== Pattern ===
Many textures appear to repeat the same motif. When a motif is repeated over and over again in a surface, it results in a pattern. Patterns are frequently used in fashion design or textile design, where motifs are repeated to create decorative patterns on fabric or other textile materials. Similarly, print design utilizes patterns to create background textures for packaging, stationery, and marketing collateral. Patterns are also used in architectural design, where decorative structural elements such as windows, columns, or pediments, are incorporated into building design.

== See also ==
- Composition (visual arts)
- Interior design
- Landscape design
- Pattern language
- Elements of art
- Color theory
