= Elements of art =

Stylistic features of a piece of visual art

The elements of art are stylistic features utilized in the making of a piece of visual art through which the artist communicates meaning. The seven most common elements include line, shape, texture, form, space, color and value, with the additions of mark making, and materiality. When analyzing these intentionally utilized design principles, the viewer is guided towards a deeper understanding of the work.

== Line ==
Lines are marks moving in a space between two points whereby a viewer can visualize the stroke movement, direction, and intention based on how the line is oriented. Lines describe an outline, capable of producing texture according to their length and curve. There are different types of lines artists may use, including, actual, implied, vertical, horizontal, diagonal and contour lines, which all have different functions. Lines are also situational elements, requiring the viewer to have knowledge of the physical world in order to understand their flexibility, rigidity, synthetic nature, or life.

== Shape ==
A shape is a two-dimensional design encased by lines to signify its height and width structure, and can have different values of color used within it to make it appear three-dimensional. In animation, shapes are used to give a character a distinct personality and features, with the animator manipulating the shapes to provide new life. There are different types of shapes an artist can use and fall under either geometrical shapes, defined by mathematics, or organic shapes, created by an artist. Simplistic, geometrical shapes include circles, triangles and squares, and provide a symbolic and synthetic feeling, whereas acute angled shapes with sharp points are perceived as dangerous shapes. Rectilinear shapes are viewed as dependable and more structurally sound, while curvilinear shapes are chaotic and adaptable.

== Form ==
Form is a three-dimensional object with volume of height, width and depth. These objects include cubes, spheres and cylinders. Form is often used when referring to physical works of art, like sculptures, as form is connected most closely with those three-dimensional works.

== Color ==
Color is an element consisting of hues, of which there are three properties: hue, chroma or intensity, and value. Color is present when light strikes an object and is reflected back into the eye, a reaction to a hue arising in the optic nerve. The first of the properties is hue, which is the distinguishable color, like red, blue or yellow. The next property is value, meaning the lightness or darkness of the hue. The last is chroma or intensity, distinguishing between strong and weak colors. A visual representation of chromatic scale is observable through the color wheel that uses the primary colors. Color is divided into various classes, primary color, secondary color, complementary color, tertiary color, analogous color and neutral color. Primary colors are fundamental colors and cannot be achieved by mixture of other colors (they are not mixable) and they are red, yellow and blue. Secondary colors are colors produced when two primary colors (of equal rate) are mixed together.

== Space (positive and negative space) ==
Space refers to the perspective (distance between and around) and proportion (size) between shapes and objects and how their relationship with the foreground or background is perceived. There are different types of spaces an artist can achieve for different effect. Positive space refers to the areas of the work with a subject, while negative space is the space without a subject. Open and closed space coincides with three-dimensional art, like sculptures, where open spaces are empty, and closed spaces contain physical sculptural elements.

== Texture ==
Texture is used to describe the surface quality of the work, referencing the types of lines the artist created. The surface quality can either be tactile (real) or strictly visual (implied). Tactile surface quality is mainly seen through three-dimensional works, like sculptures, as the viewer can see and/or feel the different textures present, while visual surface quality describes how the eye perceives the texture based on visual cues.

== Value ==
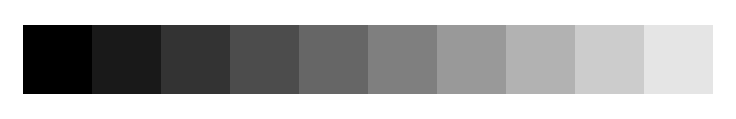
A linear scale between dark (black) and light (white) values

Value refers to the degree of perceivable lightness of tones within an image. The element of value is compatible with the term luminosity, and can be "measured in various units designating electromagnetic radiation". The difference in values is often called contrast, and references the lightest (white) and darkest (black) tones of a work of art, with an infinite number of grey variants in between. While it is most relative to the greyscale, though, it is also exemplified within colored images.

== Mark making ==
Mark making is the interaction between the artist and the materials they are using. It provides the viewer of the work with an image of what the artist had done to create the mark, reliving what the artist had done at the time. Materiality is the choice of materials used and how it impacts the work of art and how the viewer perceives it.
