= Architectural pattern book =

Book of standardized architectural designs

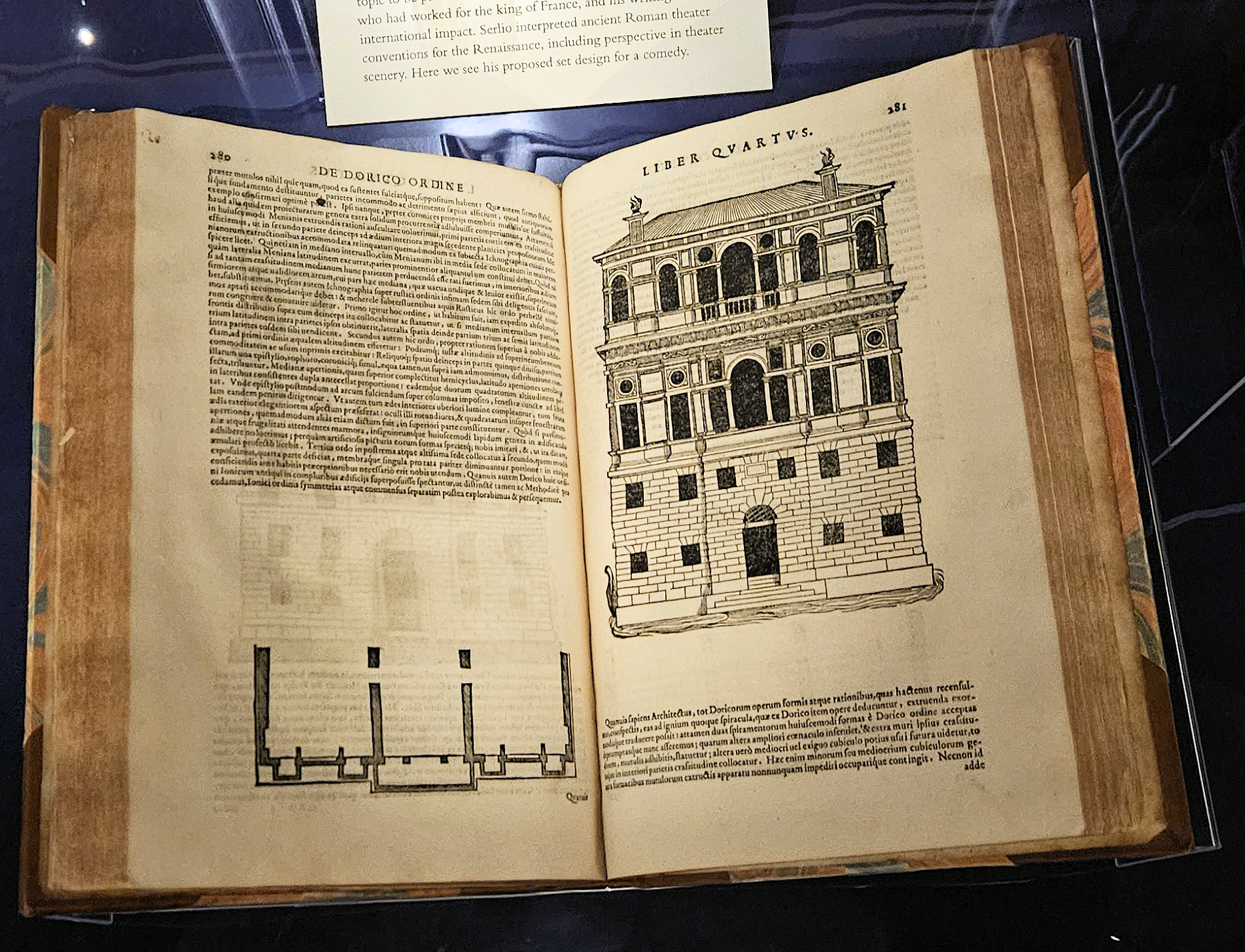
Sebastiano Serlio's Tutte l'Opere d'Architettura e Prospetiva, 1569

A pattern book, or architectural pattern book, is a book of architectural designs, usually providing enough for non-architects to build structures that are copies or significant derivatives of major architect-designed works.

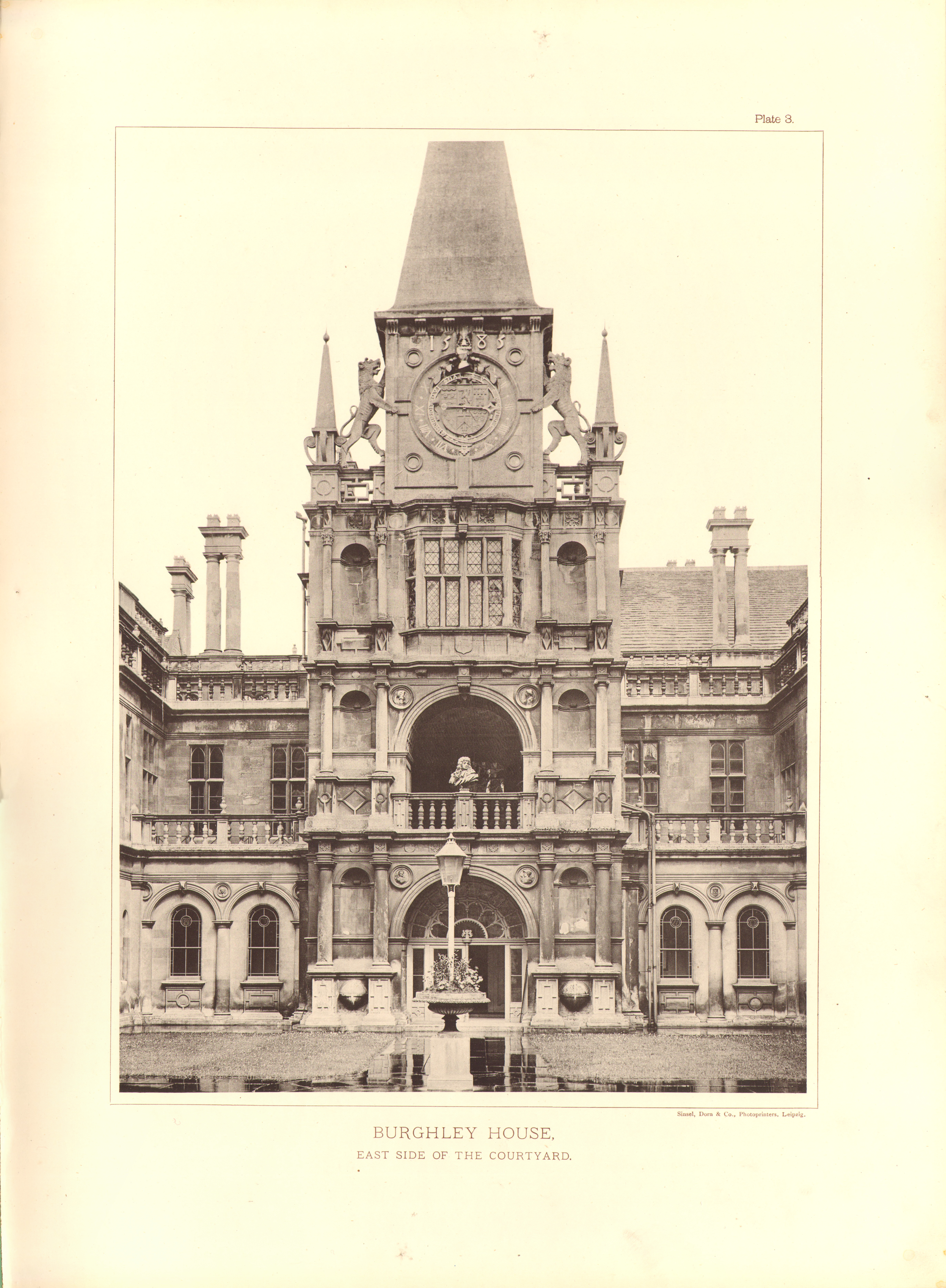
The Tower of the Orders at Burghley House, England, based on pattern books like Serlio's rather than any real Roman buildings.

A number of pattern books have been very influential in spreading architectural styles.

== Use in China ==
The Yingzao Fashi (Treatise on Architectural Methods or State Building Standards) is a late 11th century Chinese governmental construction manual, revising older treatises and including images of construction details such as dougong brackets.

== Use in Europe ==
After the invention of the printing press in c.1440, illustrated books on architecture began to be published in Europe for the first time. Initially, these works were very expensive, but they gradually became more accessible. This coincided with the emergence of the Renaissance in architecture. Printed books such as Serlio's Tutte l'opere d'architettura e prospetiva (published in stages, 1537-75) played an important role in disseminating Renaissance forms, particularly the Five Orders. However, the illustrations often showed details, rather than complete buildings, meaning that buildings erected following them often differed greatly from the original Roman precedents, especially in northern Europe, where there were fewer genuine Roman remains to study.

Later pattern books included Batty Langley's The Builder's Jewel (1741), William Halfpenny's The Builder's Pocket Companion (1728) and William Salmon's Palladio Londinensis (1734). These works were cheaply available to builders, shamelessly plagiarising more highbrow works like Colen Campbell's Vitruvius Britannicus (1715 et seq.) and James Gibbs's A Book of Architecture (1728). This introduced Baroque and Palladian details to vernacular architecture; historian Nikolaus Pevsner noted that in the town of Stamford, 'For each door and window a source can be found in publications such as Batty Langley's, William Halfpenny's, and William Salmon's,' describing this as 'an engaging faith in the pattern book.'

== Use in America ==
An early author of pattern books was American architect Minard Lafever. In 1829 he published The Young Builders' General Instructor, followed by Modern Builders' Guide in 1833, The Beauties of Modern Architecture in 1835 and The Architectural Instructor in 1850. His pattern books were influential in spreading his Greek Revival style, which is known as the first major non-British high architectural style in the United States. The style was popular for being not British, and for association with Greek history, ancient and modern, and was greatly facilitated by the pattern books.

Orson Squire Fowler notably made a mark on American architecture when he touted the advantages of octagonal homes over rectangular and square structures in his widely publicized book, The Octagon House: A Home For All, or A New, Cheap, Convenient, and Superior Mode of Building, printed in the year 1848. It is argued by some that this is incorrectly termed a pattern book, but as a result of this popular and influential publication, a few thousand octagonal houses were in fact erected in the United States.

Another was Samuel Chamberlain's Tudor Homes of England, which introduced Tudor and Norman elements, such as turrets, stained-glass windows, and spiral staircases into American architecture.

Palliser, Palliser & Company published nine pattern books, the first of which sold for $.25 and achieved wide distribution, during the period from 1876 to 1896.

After the American Civil War, Second Empire architecture was considered the perfect style for many to demonstrate their wealth and express their new power in their respective communities. The style diffused by the publications of designs in pattern books and adopted the adaptability and eclecticism that Italianate architecture had when interpreted by more middle-class clients. This caused more modest homes to depart from the ornamentation found in French examples in favor of simpler and more eclectic American ornamentation that had been established in the 1850s. In practice, most Second Empire houses simply followed the same patterns developed by Alexander Jackson Davis and Samuel Sloan, the symmetrical plan, the L-plan, for the Italianate style, adding a mansard roof to the composition. Thus, most Second Empire houses exhibited the same ornamentational and stylistic features as contemporary Italianate forms, differing only in the presence or absence of a mansard roof. Second Empire was also a frequent choice of style for remodeling older houses. Frequently, owners of Italianate, Colonial, or Federal houses chose to add a mansard roof and French ornamental features to update their homes in the latest fashions.

== See also ==
- Pattern (architecture)
- A Pattern Language
