= Pattern (architecture) =

Pattern in architecture is the idea of capturing architectural design ideas as archetypal and reusable descriptions. The term pattern in this context is usually attributed to Christopher Alexander, an Austrian born American architect. The patterns serve as an aid to design cities and buildings. The concept of having collections of "patterns", or typical samples as such, is much older. One can think of these collections as forming a pattern language, whereas the elements of this language may be combined, governed by certain rules.

This may be distinct from common use of pattern books, which are collections of architectural plans which may be copied in new works.

== Alexander's idea of patterns ==
Alexander's patterns seek to provide a source of proven ideas for individuals and communities to use in constructing their living and working environment. As such their aim is both aesthetic and political: to show how beautiful, comfortable and flexible built environments can be constructed, and to enable those people who will inhabit those environments to challenge any solution forced upon them.

A pattern records the design decisions taken by many builders in many places over many years in order to resolve a particular problem. Alexander describes a problem in terms of the so-called forces that act in it, and the solution is said to resolve those forces. If there are still unresolved forces, then additional patterns may be needed to balance these remaining forces.

== Pattern language ==
Patterns may be collected together into a pattern language that addresses a particular domain. A large body of patterns was published by Alexander and his collaborators as A Pattern Language. The patterns in that book were intended to enable communities to construct and modify their own homes, workplaces, towns and cities.

Other than Alexander's own projects, few building projects have tried to use Alexander's patterns. Those that have done so have met a mixed response from other architects, builders, architectural critics, and users. Alexander has come to believe that patterns themselves are not enough, and that one needs a "morphogenetic" understanding of the formation of the built environment. He has published his ideas in the four-volume work The Nature of Order.

While the pattern language idea has so far had limited impact on the building industry, it has had a profound influence on many workers in the information technology industry.

== See also ==
=== Architecture ===
- Design pattern
- Mathematics and architecture

=== Computer science ===
- Architectural pattern (computer science)
- Design pattern (computer science)
- Pattern language
