= Design principles =

Design principles are fundamental guidelines or concepts in the visual arts used to help viewers understand a given scene.

== Principles ==
Generally, design principles guide the viewer's attention by manipulating various aspects of a visual idea. These principles include:

=== Scale ===
Scale describes the relative sizes of the elements in a design. By using scale to make an element larger than others appearing with it, you can emphasise that element. Not only can you make an element stand out this way, you can also use scale to create a sense of depth (since nearer objects appear larger to the human eye). Exaggerated image scales also add a certain level of interest and drama.

=== White space ===
Negative space (also known as white space) is the empty area around a (positive) shape. The relationship between the shape and its surroundings is called "figure/ground," where the shape is the figure and the area around it is the ground. We should be aware that when designing positive shapes, we are also designing negative spaces at the same time. Negative space is just as important as the positive shape itself — because it helps to define the boundaries of the positive space and brings balance to a composition.

=== Movement ===
The illusion of motion can be created by repeating an object rhythmically or by bending its shape. For instance, a phone hovering over a person indicates that someone has answered an incoming call.

=== Patterns ===
Humans recognize repeating objects and distinguish them from unfamiliar ones, which can direct attention.

=== Closure ===
The principle of closure describes a psychological mechanism of human perception. Humans tend to automatically fill in missing parts when a pattern is implied.

=== Balance ===
Balance is the principle governing how we distribute the elements of a design evenly. Balanced designs tend to appear calm, stable and natural, while imbalanced designs make us feel uneasy. Balance can be achieved by having symmetry in the design (for instance, having a webpage with centralised text and images). However, you can also achieve balance without symmetry — perhaps unsurprisingly, this is known as asymmetrical balance. We achieve asymmetrical balance when we arrange differently sized elements in a way that results in unity. We can imagine a centre point of the design and distribute the elements in a way that creates balance.

=== Tone, value and contrast ===
Changes in the characteristics of color can alter a viewer's perception. Increasing the contrast of an object makes it stand out. Adjusting the value (lightness or darkness) may enhance readability. Monochromatic, analogous, or complementary color schemes can be used to create a harmonious and pleasing effect.

=== Frame ===
The frame around objects in a scene confines them to one space, helping to define the composition.

=== Grid ===
Artists often use a grid to help arrange objects. Common methods include the rule of thirds (a 3x3 grid) and the golden ratio.

== See also ==
- Composition (visual arts)
- Gestalt laws of grouping
- Interior design
- Landscape design
- Pattern language
- Elements of art
- Principles of art
- Color theory
