= Pattern language =

Method of describing good design practices

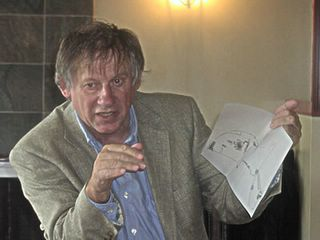
Alexander leading a workshop on creating the generative code for a new neighbourhood of houses, 2005

A pattern language is an organized and coherent set of patterns, each of which describes a problem and the core of a solution that can be used in many ways within a specific field of expertise. The term was coined by architect Christopher Alexander and popularized by his 1977 book A Pattern Language.

A pattern language can also be an attempt to express the deeper wisdom of what brings aliveness within a particular field of human endeavor, through a set of interconnected patterns. Aliveness is one placeholder term for "the quality that has no name": a sense of wholeness, spirit, or grace, that while of varying form, is precise and empirically verifiable. Alexander claims that ordinary people can use this design approach to successfully solve very large, complex design problems.

== What is a pattern? ==
When a designer designs something – whether a house, computer program, or lamp – they must make many decisions about how to solve problems. A single problem is documented with its typical place (the syntax), and use (the grammar) with the most common and recognized good solution seen in the wild, like the examples seen in dictionaries. Each such entry is a single design pattern. Each pattern has a name, a descriptive entry, and some cross-references, much like a dictionary entry. A documented pattern should explain why that solution is good in the pattern's contexts.

Elemental or universal patterns such as "door" or "partnership" are versatile ideals of design, either as found in experience or for use as components in practice, explicitly described as holistic resolutions of the forces in recurrent contexts and circumstances, whether in architecture, medicine, software development or governance, etc. Patterns might be invented or found and studied, such as the naturally occurring patterns of design that characterize human environments.

Like all languages, a pattern language has vocabulary, syntax, and grammar – but a pattern language applies to some complex activity other than communication. In pattern languages for design, the parts break down in this way:

- The language description – the vocabulary – is a collection of named, described solutions to problems in a field of interest. These are called design patterns. So, for example, the language for architecture describes items like: settlements, buildings, rooms, windows, latches, etc.
- Each solution includes syntax, a description that shows where the solution fits in a larger, more comprehensive or more abstract design. This automatically links the solution into a web of other needed solutions. For example, rooms have ways to get light, and ways to get people in and out.
- The solution includes grammar that describes how the solution solves a problem or produces a benefit. So, if the benefit is unneeded, the solution is not used. Perhaps that part of the design can be left empty to save money or other resources; if people do not need to wait to enter a room, a simple doorway can replace a waiting room.
- In the language description, grammar and syntax cross index (often with a literal alphabetic index of pattern names) to other named solutions, so the designer can quickly think from one solution to related, needed solutions, and document them in a logical way. In Christopher Alexander's book A Pattern Language, the patterns are in decreasing order by size, with a separate alphabetic index.
- The web of relationships in the index of the language provides many paths through the design process.

This simplifies the design work because designers can start the process from any part of the problem they understand and work toward the unknown parts. At the same time, if the pattern language has worked well for many projects, there is reason to believe that even a designer who does not completely understand the design problem at first will complete the design process, and the result will be usable. For example, skiers coming inside must shed snow and store equipment. The messy snow and boot cleaners should stay outside. The equipment needs care, so the racks should be inside.

== Many patterns form a language ==
Just as words must have grammatical and semantic relationships to each other in order to make a spoken language useful, design patterns must be related to each other in position and utility order to form a pattern language. Christopher Alexander's work describes a process of decomposition, in which the designer has a problem (perhaps a commercial assignment), selects a solution, then discovers new, smaller problems resulting from the larger solution. Occasionally, the smaller problems have no solution, and a different larger solution must be selected. Eventually all of the remaining design problems are small enough or routine enough to be solved by improvisation by the builders, and the "design" is done.

The actual organizational structure (hierarchical, iterative, etc.) is left to the discretion of the designer, depending on the problem. This explicitly lets a designer explore a design, starting from some small part. When this happens, it's common for a designer to realize that the problem is actually part of a larger solution. At this point, the design almost always becomes a better design.

In the language, therefore, each pattern has to indicate its relationships to other patterns and to the language as a whole. This gives the designer using the language a great deal of guidance about the related problems that must be solved.

The most difficult part of having an outside expert apply a pattern language is to get a reliable, complete list of the problems to be solved. The people most familiar with the problems are the people that need a design. So, Alexander advocated on-site improvisation by concerned, empowered users, as a powerful way to form very workable large-scale initial solutions, maximizing the utility of a design, and minimizing the design rework. The desire to empower users of architecture was what motivated Alexander to undertake a pattern language project for architecture.

== Design problems in a context ==
An important aspect of design patterns is to identify and document the key ideas that make a good system different from a poor system (that may be a house, a computer program or an object of daily use), and to assist in the design of future systems. The idea expressed in a pattern should be general enough to be applied in very different systems within its context, but still specific enough to give constructive guidance.

The range of situations in which the problems and solutions addressed in a pattern apply is called its context. An important part in each pattern is to describe this context. Examples can further illustrate how the pattern applies to very different situation.

For instance, Alexander's pattern "A PLACE TO WAIT" addresses bus stops in the same way as waiting rooms in a surgery, while still proposing helpful and constructive solutions. The "Gang-of-Four" book Design Patterns by Gamma et al. proposes solutions that are independent of the programming language, and the program's application domain.

Still, the problems and solutions described in a pattern can vary in their level of abstraction and generality on the one side, and specificity on the other side. In the end this depends on the author's preferences. However, even a very abstract pattern will usually contain examples that are, by nature, absolutely concrete and specific.

Patterns can also vary in how far they are proven in the real world. Alexander gives each pattern a rating by zero, one or two stars, indicating how well they are proven in real-world examples. It is generally claimed that all patterns need at least some existing real-world examples. It is, however, conceivable to document yet unimplemented ideas in a pattern-like format.

The patterns in Alexander's book also vary in their level of scale – some describing how to build a town or neighbourhood, others dealing with individual buildings and the interior of rooms. Alexander sees the low-scale artifacts as constructive elements of the large-scale world, so they can be connected to a hierarchic network.

=== Balancing of forces ===
A pattern must characterize the problems that it is meant to solve, the context or situation where these problems arise, and the conditions under which the proposed solutions can be recommended.

Often these problems arise from a conflict of different interests or "forces". A pattern emerges as a dialogue that will then help to balance the forces and finally make a decision.

For instance, there could be a pattern suggesting a wireless telephone. The forces would be the need to communicate, and the need to get other things done at the same time (cooking, inspecting the bookshelf). A very specific pattern would be just "WIRELESS TELEPHONE". More general patterns would be "WIRELESS DEVICE" or "SECONDARY ACTIVITY", suggesting that a secondary activity (such as talking on the phone, or inspecting the pockets of your jeans) should not interfere with other activities.

Though quite unspecific in its context, the forces in the "SECONDARY ACTIVITY" pattern are very similar to those in "WIRELESS TELEPHONE". Thus, the competing forces can be seen as part of the essence of a design concept expressed in a pattern.

=== Patterns contain their own rationale ===
Usually a pattern contains a rationale referring to some given values. For Christopher Alexander, it is most important to think about the people who will come in contact with a piece of architecture. One of his key values is making these people feel more alive. He talks about the "quality without a name" (QWAN).

More generally, we could say that a good system should be accepted, welcomed and happily embraced as an enrichment of daily life by those who are meant to use it, or – even better – by all people it affects. For instance, when discussing a street café, Alexander discusses the possible desires of a guest, but also mentions people who just walk by.

The same thinking can be applied to technical devices such as telephones and cars, to social structures like a team working on a project, or to the user interface of a computer program. The qualities of a software system, for instance, could be rated by observing whether users spend their time enjoying or struggling with the system.

By focusing on the impacts on human life, we can identify patterns that are independent from changing technology, and thus find "timeless quality" (Alexander).

== Generic structure and layout ==
Usually the author of a pattern language or collection chooses a generic structure for all the patterns it contains, breaking each into generic sections like context, problem statement, solution etc.

Christopher Alexander's patterns, for instance, each consist of a short name, a rating (up to two '*' symbols), a sensitizing picture, the context description, the problem statement, a longer part of text with examples and explanations, a solution statement, a sketch and further references. This structure and layout is sometimes referred to as the "Alexandrian form".

Alexander uses a special text layout to mark the different sections of his patterns. For instance, the problem statement and the solution statement are printed in bold font, the latter is always preceded by the "Therefore:" keyword. Some authors instead use explicit labels, which creates some degree of redundancy.

=== Meaningful names ===
When design is done by a team, pattern names will form a vocabulary they can share. This makes it necessary for pattern names to be easy to remember and highly descriptive. Some examples from Alexander's works are WINDOW PLACE (helps define where windows should go in a room) and A PLACE TO WAIT (helps define the characteristics of bus stops and hospital waiting rooms, for example).

== Aggregation in an associative network (pattern language) ==
A pattern language, as conceived by Alexander, contains links from one pattern to another, so when trying to apply one pattern in a project, a designer is pushed to other patterns that are considered helpful in its context.

In Alexander's book, such links are collected in the "references" part, and echoed in the linked pattern's "context" part – thus the overall structure is a directed graph. A pattern that is linked to in the "references" usually addresses a problem of lower scale, that is suggested as a part of the higher-scale problem. For instance, the "PUBLIC OUTDOOR ROOM" pattern has a reference to "STAIR SEATS".

Even without the pattern description, these links, along with meaningful names, carry a message: When building a place outside where people can spend time ("PUBLIC OUTDOOR ROOM"), consider to surround it by stairs where people can sit ("STAIR SEATS"). If you are planning an office ("WORKSHOPS AND OFFICES"), consider to arrange workspaces in small groups ("SMALL WORKING GROUPS"). Alexander argues that the connections in the network can be considered even more meaningful than the text of the patterns themselves.

The links in Alexander's book clearly result in a hierarchic network. Alexander draws a parallel to the hierarchy of a grammar – that is one argument for him to speak of a pattern language.

The idea of linking is generally accepted among pattern authors, though the semantic rationale behind the links may vary. Some authors, however, like Gamma et al. in Design Patterns, make only little use of pattern linking – possibly because it did not make that much sense for their collection of patterns. In such a case we would speak of a pattern catalogue rather than a pattern language.

=== Usage ===
Alexander encouraged people who used his system to expand his language with patterns of their own. In order to enable this, his books do not focus strictly on architecture or civil engineering; he also explains the general method of pattern languages. The original concept for the book A Pattern Language was that it would be published in the form of a ring binder, so that pages could easily be added later; this proved impractical in publishing. The pattern language approach has been used to document expertise in diverse fields. Some examples are architectural patterns, computer science patterns, interaction design patterns, pedagogical patterns, pattern gardening, social action patterns, and group facilitation patterns. The pattern language approach has also been recommended as a way to promote civic intelligence by helping to coordinate actions for diverse people and communities who are working together on significant shared problems. Alexander's specifications for using pattern languages as well as creating new ones remain influential, and his books are referenced for style by experts in unrelated fields.

Notations such as UML or the flowchart symbol collection are not pattern languages. They could more closely be compared to an alphabet: their symbols could be used to document a pattern language, but they are not a language by themselves. A recipe or other sequential set of steps to be followed, with only one correct path from start to finish, is also not a pattern language. However, the process of designing a new recipe might benefit from the use of a pattern language.

=== Simple example of a pattern ===
- Name: ChocolateChipRatio
- Context: You are baking chocolate chip cookies in small batches for family and friends
- Consider these patterns first: SugarRatio, FlourRatio, EggRatio
- Problem: Determine the optimum ratio of chocolate chips to cookie dough
- Solution: Observe that most people consider chocolate to be the best part of the chocolate chip cookie. Also observe that too much chocolate may prevent the cookie from holding together, decreasing its appeal. Since you are cooking in small batches, cost is not a consideration. Therefore, use the maximum amount of chocolate chips that results in a really sturdy cookie.
- Consider next: NutRatio or CookingTime or FreezingMethod

== Origin ==
Christopher Alexander, an architect and author, coined the term pattern language. He used it to refer to common problems of the design and construction of buildings and towns and how they should be solved. The solutions proposed in the book include suggestions ranging from how cities and towns should be structured to where windows should be placed in a room.

The framework and philosophy of the "pattern language" approach was initially popularized in the book A Pattern Language that was written by Christopher Alexander and five colleagues at the Center for Environmental Structure in Berkeley, California in the late 1970s. While A Pattern Language contains 253 "patterns" from the first pattern, "Independent Regions" (the most general) to the last, "Things from Your Life", Alexander's book The Timeless Way of Building goes into more depth about the motivation and purpose of the work. The following definitions of "pattern" and "pattern language" are paraphrased from A Pattern Language:

"A pattern is a careful description of a perennial solution to a recurring problem within a building context, describing one of the configurations that brings life to a building. Each pattern describes a problem that occurs over and over again in our environment, and then describes the core solution to that problem, in such a way that you can use the solution a million times over, without ever doing it the same way twice."

A pattern language is a network of patterns that call upon one another. Patterns help us remember insights and knowledge about design and can be used in combination to create solutions.

== Application domains ==
Christopher Alexander's idea has been adopted in other disciplines, often much more heavily than the original application of patterns to architecture as depicted in the book A Pattern Language. Examples since the 1990s include software design patterns in software engineering and, more generally, architectural patterns in computer science, as well as interaction design patterns. Since the late 1990s, pedagogical patterns have been used to document good practices in teaching. Since at least the mid-2000s, the idea of pattern language was introduced into systems architecture design and Design science (methodology) patterns in a book authored by Vijay Vaishnavi and William Kuechler with 66 patterns; the second revised and expanded edition of this book has been published in 2015 with 84 patterns. The book Liberating Voices: A Pattern Language for Communication Revolution, containing 136 patterns for using information and communication to promote sustainability, democracy and positive social change, was published in 2008 along with a website containing even more patterns. The deck "Group Works: A Pattern Language for Bringing Life to Meetings and Other Gatherings" was published in 2011. The idea of a pattern language has also been applied in permaculture design.

Ward Cunningham, the inventor of wiki, coauthored a paper with Michael Mehaffy arguing that there are deep relationships between wikis and pattern languages, and that wikis "were in fact developed as tools to facilitate efficient sharing and modifying of patterns".

== See also ==
- Feng shui – Chinese traditional practice
- Method engineering
- Modular design – Design approach
- Modularity – Degree to which a system's components may be separated and recombined
- Rule of thumb – Approximate method for doing something
- Shearing layers – Systems theory concept
- Systems theory – Interdisciplinary study of systems
- Typology (urban planning and architecture) – Classification of buildings and urban places
