= Architectural design values =

Architectural design values make up an important part of what influences architects and designers when they make their design decisions. However, architects and designers are not always influenced by the same values and intentions. Value and intentions differ between different architectural movements. It also differs between different schools of architecture and schools of design as well as among individual architects and designers.

The differences in values and intentions are directly linked to the pluralism in design outcomes that exist within architecture and design. It is also a big contributing factor as to how an architect or designer operates in his/her relation to clients.

Different design values tend to have a considerable history and can be found in numerous design movements. The influence that each design value has had on design movements and individual designers has varied throughout history.

== Aesthetic design values ==
The expansion of architectural and industrial design ideas and vocabularies which took place during the last century has created a diverse aesthetic reality within these two domains. This pluralistic and diverse aesthetic reality has typically been created within different architectural and industrial design movements such as: Modernism, Postmodernism, Deconstructivism, Post-structuralism, Neoclassicism, New Expressionism, Supermodernism, etc. All of these aesthetic realities represent a number of divergent aesthetic values, in addition to differences in general values and theories found within these movements. Some of the stylistic distinctions found in these diverse aesthetic realities reflects profound differences in design values and thinking, but this is not the case for all stylistic distinctions, as some stylistic distinctions builds on similar thinking and values.

These aesthetic values and their diverse aesthetic expressions are to some degree a reflection of the development that has taken place in the art community. In addition, more general changes have taken place in Western societies, due to technological development, new economic realities, political changes etc. However, these diverse aesthetic expressions are also a reflection of individual architects and industrial designers’ personal expression, based on designers’ tendency to experiment with form, materials, and ornament to create new aesthetic styles and aesthetic vocabulary. Changes in aesthetic styles and expressions have been, and still are, both synchronic and diachronic, as different aesthetic styles are produced and promoted simultaneously.

A number of values which cannot be classified as aesthetic design values have influenced the development of the aesthetic reality, as well as contributed to the pluralistic aesthetic reality which characterises contemporary architecture and industrial design.

Aesthetic Design Values, contains seven values.

=== Artistic aspects and self-expression ===
It is characterised by a belief that individual self-expression—or one's inner spiritual self and creative imagination, inner resources and intuition—should be utilised and/or be the base used when designing. These sentiments are closely linked to a number of artistic values found in movements like Expressionism and the Avant-garde art. Thus, this design value is closely related to abstract forms and expression, personal creative liberty, elitism and being ahead of the rest of society.

=== The spirit of the time design value ===
This design value is based on the conception that every age has a certain spirit or set of shared attitudes that should be utilised when designing. The Spirit of the Times denotes the intellectual and cultural climate of a particular era, which can be linked to an experience of a certain worldview, sense of taste, collective consciousness and unconsciousness. Thus “form expression” which can be found, to some extent in the “air” of a given time and each generation, should generate an aesthetic style that expresses the uniqueness related to that time.

=== The structural, functional and material honesty design value ===
Structural Honesty is linked to the notion that a structure shall display its “true” purpose and not be decorative etc. Functional honesty is linked to the idea that a building or product form shall be shaped on the basis of its intended function, often known as “form follows function”. Material honesty implies that materials should be used and selected on the basis of their properties, and that the characteristics of a material should influence the form it is used for. Thus, a material must not be used as a substitute for another material as this subverts the materials “true” properties and it is “cheating” the spectator.

=== The simplicity and minimalism design value ===
This design value is based on the idea that simple forms, i.e. aesthetics without considerable ornaments, simple geometry, smooth surfaces etc., represents forms which are both truer to “real” art and represents “folk” wisdom. This design value implies that the more cultivated a person becomes, the more decoration disappears. In addition, it is linked to the notion that simple forms will free people from the everyday clutter, thus contribute to tranquillity and restfulness.

=== Nature and organic design value ===
This design value is based on the idea that nature (i.e. all sorts of living organisms, numerical laws etc.) can provide inspiration, functional clues and aesthetic forms that architects and industrial designers should use as a basis for designs. Designs based on this value tend to be characterized by free-flowing curves, asymmetrical lines and expressive forms. This design value can be summed up in “form follows flow” or “of the hill” as opposed to “on the hill”.

=== The classic, traditional and vernacular aesthetics design value ===
This value is based on a belief that a building and product should be designed from timeless principles that transcend particular designers, cultures and climates. Implicit in this design value is the notion that if these forms are used, the public will appreciate a structure's timeless beauty and understand immediately how to use a given building or product. This design value is also linked to regional differences i.e. varying climate etc. and folklore cultures, which creates distinctive aesthetical expressions.

=== The regionalism design value ===
This design value is based on the belief that building—and to some degree products—should be designed in accordance with the particular characteristics of a specific place. In addition, it is linked to the aim of achieving visual harmony between a building and its surroundings, as well as achieving continuity in a given area. In other words, it strives to create a connection between past and present forms of building. Finally, this value is also often related to preserving and creating regional and national identity.

== Social design values ==
Many architects and industrial designers have a strong motivation to serve the public good and the needs of the user population. Moreover, social awareness and social values within architecture and design reflect, to some degree, the emphasis these values are given in society at large.

Social values can have an aesthetical impact, but these aspects will not be explored as the main aesthetical impact found in design has been covered in the previous sections. Social design values are at times in conflict with other design values. This type of conflict can manifest itself between different design movements, but it can also be the cause of conflicts within a given design movement. It can be argued that conflicts between social values and other design values often represent the continuing debate between Rationalism and Romanticism commonly found within architecture and industrial design.

The Social Design Values category consisting of four design values.

=== The social change design value ===
This design value can be described as a commitment to change society for the better through architecture and industrial design. This design value is closely connected and associated with political movements and subsequent building programs. Architects and industrial designers that are committed to the design value of social change often see their work as a tool for transforming the built environment and those who live in it.

=== The consultation and participation design value ===
This design value is based on a belief that it is beneficial to involve stakeholders in the design process. This value is connected to a belief that user involvement leads to:

1. Meeting social needs and an effective use of resources.
2. Influencing in the design process as well as awareness of the consequences etc.
3. Providing relevant and up-to-date information for designers.

=== The crime prevention design value ===
This design value is based on the belief that the built environment can be manipulated to reduce crime levels, which is attempted accomplished through three main strategies that are:

1. Defensible space.
2. Crime prevention through environmental design.
3. Situational crime prevention.

=== The 'Third world' design value ===
This is based on an eagerness to help developing countries through architecture and design (i.e. a response to the needs of the poor and destitute within the Third World). This design value implies that social and economic circumstances found in the Third World necessitate the development of special solutions, which are distinct from what the same architects and industrial designers would recommend for the developed world.

== Environmental design values ==
The 20th century has been marked by the re-emergence of environmental values within Western societies. Concern for the environment is not new and can be found to a varying degree throughout history, and it is rooted in a number of perspectives including the aim of managing the ecosystems for sustained resource yields (sustainable development), and the idea that everything in nature has an intrinsic value (nature protection and preservation). Generally behind these types of thinking are the concepts of stewardship and that the present generation owes duties to generations not yet born.

Environmental problems and challenges found in the 19th and 20th centuries led to a development where environmental values became important in some sections of Western societies. It is therefore not surprising that these values can also be found among individual architects and industrial designers. The focus on environmental design has been marked with the rediscovery and further development of many “ancient” skills and techniques. In addition, new technology that approaches environmental concerns is also an important characteristic of the environmental approach found among architects and industrial designers. These rather different approaches to environmental building and product technology can be illustrated with the development of environmental high-tech architecture, and the more “traditional” environmental movement within is ecological based architecture.

Environmental technology, along with new environmental values, have affected development in cities across the world. Many cities have started to formulate and introduce "eco-regulations concerning renewable resources, energy consumption, sick buildings, smart buildings, recycled materials, and sustainability". This may not be surprising, as about 50% of all energy consumption in Europe and 60% in the US is building-related. However, environmental concerns are not restricted to energy consumption; environmental concerns take on a number of perspectives generally, which are reflected in the focus found among architects and industrial designers.

The environmental design values category consists of three design values.

=== Green and sustainability ===
This value is based on a belief that a sustainable and/or environmentally friendly building design is beneficial to users, society and future generations. Key concepts within this design value are: energy conservation, resource management, recycling, cradle-to-cradle, toxic free materials etc.

=== Re-use and modification ===
This is based on a belief that existing buildings, and to some degree products, can be continuously used through updates. Within this value there are two separate schools of thought with regards to aesthetics: one camp focuses on new elements that are sublimated to an overall aesthetic, and the other advocates for aesthetical contrast, dichotomy and even dissonance between the old and the new.

=== Health ===
This design value is based on the belief that the built environment can contribute to ensuring a healthy living environment. Built into this design value, are principles like: buildings should be freestanding; sites need to be distributed to maximize the amount of sunlight that reaches individual structures. Similarly, there is an emphasis on health based construction and reduction of toxic emissions through selection of appropriate materials.

== Traditional design values ==
Within both architecture and industrial design there is a long tradition of being both inspired by and re-use design elements of existing buildings and products. This is the case even if many architects and industrial designers argue that they are primarily using their creativity to create new and novel design solutions. Some architects and industrial designers have openly led themselves be inspired by existing building and products traditions, and have even used this inspiration as the main base for their designs solutions.

This design tradition has a considerable history, which can be indicated in many of the labels associated with this tradition; this includes labels such as Classicism, Vernacular, Restoration and Preservation etc. In addition, as indicated in the previous section “Classic, Traditional and Vernacular aesthetics”, an important element of this tradition is to re-use and be inspired by already existing aesthetical elements and styles. However, the traditional approach also implies other aspects such as functional aspects, preserving existing building traditions as well as individual buildings and products.

The Traditional Design Values category, consisting of three distinct values.

=== The tradition based design value ===
This relies on a belief that traditional “designs” are the preferred typology and template for buildings and products, because they “create” timeless and “functional” designs. Within this design value there are three main strategies:

1. Critical traditionalist/regionalist i.e. interpreting the traditional typologies and templates and applying them in an abstracted modern vocabulary.
2. Revivalists i.e. adhering to the most literal traditional form.
3. Contextualists who use historical forms when the surroundings “demands” it.

=== The design value of restoration and preservation ===
This is based on a commitment to preserve the best of buildings and products for future generations. This design value tends to represent restoring a building or product to its initial design and is usually rooted in three perspectives. These are:

1. An archaeological perspective (i.e. preserving buildings and products of historical interest).
2. An artistic perspective i.e. a desire to preserve something of beauty.
3. A social perspective (i.e. a desire to hold on to the familiar and reassuring).

=== The vernacular design value ===
This value is based on a belief that a simple life and its design, closely linked to nature, are superior to that of modernity. The design value of Vernacular includes key concept such as:

1. Reinvigorating tradition (i.e. evoking the vernacular).
2. Reinventing tradition i.e. the search for new paradigms.
3. Extending tradition i.e. using the vernacular in a modified manner.
4. Reinterpreting tradition i.e. the use of contemporary idioms.

== Gender-based design values ==
These design values are closely linked to the feminist movement and theories developed within the 19th and 20th centuries. Design values based on gender are related to three tenets found in architecture and industrial design, which are:

1. Gender differences related to critique and reconstruction of architectural practice and history.
2. The struggle for equal access to training, jobs and recognition in architecture and design.
3. The focus on gender based theories for the built environment, the architectural discourse, and cultural value systems.

Designers that adhere to the Design values based on gender typically have a focus on creating buildings that do not have the same barriers that children, parents and the elderly experience in much of the built environment. It also implies a focus on aesthetics that are deemed to be more 'feminine' than the 'masculine' aesthetics often created by male designers.

== The economic design value ==
Many architects and industrial designers often dread the financial and business side of architecture and industrial design practice, as their focus is often geared towards achieving successful design quality rather than achieving successful economic expectations.

This is the basis for a design value that can be characterised as 'voluntarism' or 'charrette ethos'. This value is commonly found among practising architects and designers. The 'volunteer' value is founded in the belief that good architecture and design requires commitment beyond the prearranged time, accountant's budget, and normal hours. Implicit in the 'volunteer' value are elements of the following claim present:

1. Best design works comes from offices or individual designers which are willing to put in overtime (sometimes unpaid) for the sake of the design outcome.
2. Good architecture and design is rarely possible within fees offered by clients.
3. Architects and designers should care enough about buildings or products to uphold high design standards regardless of the payment offered.

The 'volunteer' design value can be seen as a reaction to and a rejection of the client's influence and control over the design project.

== The novel design value ==
It is common within contemporary architecture and industrial design to find emphasis on creating novel design solutions. This emphasis is often accompanied by an equally common lack of emphasis on studying of the appropriateness of any already existing design solution.

The novel design value has historical roots dating back to early design movements such as Modernism, with its emphasis on “starting from zero”. The celebration of original and novel design solutions is, by many designers and design scholars, considered one of the main aspects of architecture and design. This design value is often manifested through the working methods of designers. Some architects and designers with their emphasis on the “big idea” will have a tendency to cling to major design ideas and themes, even if these themes and ideas are faced with insurmountable challenges. However, the emphasis on design novelty is also associated with progress and new design solutions that, without this emphasis, would not see the light of day.

The design value of novelty is not generally accepted within either architecture or design. This is indicated by the debate in architecture, focusing on whether buildings should harmonize with the surroundings in that they are situated in or not. Equally is the debate where architecture should be based on traditional topology and design styles i.e. classical and vernacular base architecture or if it should be an expression of its time. The same issues are indicated within the industrial design domain where it has been debated if retro design should be accepted or not as good design.

== Mathematical and scientific design values ==
A movement to base architectural design on scientific and mathematical understanding started with the early work of Christopher Alexander in the 1960s, Notes on the synthesis of form. Other contributors joined in, especially in investigations of form on the urban scale, which resulted in important developments such as Bill Hillier's Space syntax and Michael Batty's work on Spatial analysis. In architecture, the four-volume work The Nature of Order by Alexander summarizes his most recent results. An alternative architectural theory based on scientific laws, as for example A Theory of Architecture is now competing with purely aesthetic theories most common in architectural academia. This entire body of work can be seen as balancing and often questioning design movements that rely primarily upon aesthetics and novelty. At the same time, the scientific results that determine this approach in fact verify traditional and vernacular traditions in a way that purely historical appreciation cannot.

Social and environmental issues are given a new explanation, drawing upon biological phenomena and the interactivity of groups and individuals with their built environment. The new discipline of biophilia developed by E. O. Wilson plays a major role in explaining the human need for intimate contact with natural forms and living beings. This insight into the connection between human beings and the biological environment provides a new understanding for the need for ecological design. An extension of the biophilic phenomenon into artificial environments suggests a corresponding need for built structures that embody the same precepts as biological structures. These mathematical qualities include fractal forms, scaling, multiple symmetries, etc.. Applications and extensions of Wilson's original idea are now carried out by Stephen R. Kellert in the Biophilia hypothesis, and in by Nikos Salingaros and others in the book "Biophilic Design".

== See also ==
- Architect
- Architectural design competition
- Architectural designer
- Architecture for Humanity
- Digital morphogenesis
- Green building
- Low-energy house
- Passive cooling
- Passive house
- Passive solar building design
- Sustainable architecture
