= A Theory of Architecture =

2006 book by Nikos Salingaros

- Author: Nikos Salingaros
- Language: English
- Subject: Architecture
- Genre: Non-fiction
- Publisher: Umbau-Verlag
- Publication date: 2006

A Theory of Architecture is a 2006 book on architecture by Nikos Salingaros published by Umbau-Verlag. Cover recommendations are by Kenneth G. Masden II, Duncan G. Stroik, Michael Blowhard, and Dean A. Dykstra with a preface by Prince Charles and Foreword by Kenneth G. Masden II. The book is a re-working of previously published articles used to teach a senior architecture studio class. Four of the twelve chapters were originally written in collaboration with co-authors Michael Mehaffy, Terry Mikiten, Debora Tejada, and Hing-Sing Yu.

== Originality ==
This book joins a recent movement to explain socio-cultural phenomena by means of scientific models. Writers who have spearheaded this general effort by writing popular science with serious implications include Richard Dawkins, Steven Pinker, and Edward Osborne Wilson. Ever since Benoit Mandelbrot mentioned that traditional architecture was more intrinsically fractal than 20th century buildings, people have been intrigued about the possibility of understanding architectural form in mathematical terms. The fractal nature of natural structures is evident in topography, and people have noticed that traditional architecture blends better with the landscape.

Salingaros builds upon Christopher Alexander's work, including Notes on the Synthesis of Form, A Pattern Language, and The Nature of Order. Salingaros has collaborated with Alexander for many years, and was one of the editors of "The Nature of Order". He proposes mathematical laws of scaling, argues for an essential role for fractals in architecture, and describes rules for coherence among subdivisions that can help produce a more pleasing design. He claims that these are, in effect, original aesthetic rules coming from science rather than from any traditional artistic sources. Yet, like Alexander, Salingaros argues that this design theory corresponds more closely to what humans have evolved to appreciate. The book introduces many innovative science-based ways of approaching design, and opposes abstract or formal methods based on imageability.

== Influence ==
Prince Charles wrote the Preface to the book, declaring Salingaros to be "an intriguing, perhaps historically important, new thinker". The book is not about Classical architecture. Like Prince Charles, Salingaros is an admirer of Islamic architecture, and the design theory he presents is claimed to be equally valid for Classical, Islamic, or any other vernacular or traditional architecture. Salingaros' book presents a different view of architecture and design from the teaching texts used for courses in architecture schools during the past several decades. He criticizes present-day architectural education for continuing to rely uncritically on models that he argues lead automatically to non-adaptivity and unsustainability.

Anthropologists K. Sorvig and J. Quillien commented: "The spirit of Jacob Bronowski permeates the work of Nikos Salingaros. A Theory of Architecture takes us directly to the heart of difficult questions. Salingaros explores ways to clarify and formalize the understanding of aesthetic forms in the built environment, using mathematics, thermodynamics, Darwinism, complexity theory and cognitive sciences. He postulates that cross-cultural universals derived from scaling rules in nature govern human appreciation of architecture."

Architect and educator Ashraf Salama observed: "This book is of great value to architectural educators. It helps them correct some of the misconceptions inherited in architectural education ... Knowledge is usually presented to students in a retrospective way where abstract and symbolic generalizations used to describe research results do not convey the feel of the behavior of the phenomena they describe; the late Donald Schön emphasized this view in 1988 ... Rather than giving students ready-made interpretations about the work of star architects, this book offers a deeper insight into the understanding of the true essence of architecture..."

Individual chapters have been translated into several languages.

== Primary topics ==
=== Darwinian processes ===
Designs evolve in two ways: in the architect's mind towards a final conception, and by variants of a building typology being built on the ground. A Darwinian process plays a significant role in both design and architectural typologies' evolution (or persistence). Salingaros creates a framework where these mechanisms determine how designs evolve, and outline a detailed model. The key concern is understanding the criteria for selection among competing variants: is selection driven by adaptation to human needs, or is it based upon matching to arbitrary images; what type of architecture results from each?

Salingaros builds on the work of Richard Dawkins, especially the meme model, to explain how architectural typologies and design elements are transmitted in society; an innovative application, but one that underlies a trenchant criticism of modernist, post-modernist, and deconstructivist architectural styles. Salingaros claims they are not adaptive: he argues that they transmit in society like an advertising jingle, and not because of intrinsic worthwhile qualities. Supporting arguments are explored in this book.

=== Complexity ===
Salingaros uses a model of organized complexity to estimate the degree of "life" in a building, a quantity that measures the organization of visual information. His model is based on an analogy with the physics of thermodynamic processes and extends earlier work by Herbert A. Simon and Warren Weaver. The terminology arises from an analogy with biological forms. Salingaros distinguished between "organized" and "unorganized" complexity, going further to claim innate (biologically based) positive advantages of the former.

The book claims, at least for those who like traditional buildings, the correlation between Salingaros' "life" measure and the perceived degree of life in a building is high. Minimalist and deconstructivist buildings, on the other hand, rate very low, and this is a point of controversy with most architects. Christopher Alexander reproduces Salingaros' results in Book 1 of "The Nature of Order", saying that: "It is telling that a simply constructed arithmetical function, based on the considerations of the nature of the living structure, no matter how crudely, could get these kinds of results at all. It shows that, while the question itself may be a million times more subtle, there is something tangible, and ultimately measurable, in the degree of life the living structure has."

=== Emergence and evidence-based design ===
Salingaros describes architecture (or at least architecture that he terms "adaptive") as a characteristic phenomenon of Emergence. Contemporary architectural thinking has recently been moving in this direction, and this book attempts to advance the field forward. The author claims that Architectural theory has degenerated into a narrow point of view, neglecting architectural space and meaning. In proposing a broader discourse, some contemporary theorists are turning once again to phenomenology. Christopher Alexander and Salingaros claim to move past the limited philosophical tools of phenomenology to derive evidence-based results. Evidence-based design is already being used in the innovative design of healing environments such as hospitals and healthcare facilities. In parallel with intellectual advances in other fields driven by the revolution in scientific research at the end of the last millennium, authors such as Salingaros, Alexander, and others seek to build theoretical knowledge in architecture from experimental findings.

These arguments are now being adopted and supplemented by a group of architects applying biophilia, a term coined by Edward Osborne Wilson to describe an intrinsic, genetic predisposition of human beings towards structures found in other living objects such as animals and plants. The key researchers in biophilic design refer to Salingaros' work, and to chapters of this book in particular.

=== Pattern languages ===
Salingaros develops pattern languages originally introduced by Christopher Alexander and used in architecture as well as in software design. He earlier wrote an influential paper "The Structure of Pattern Languages", which described the combinatorics of patterns necessary to use them effectively. This applies both to software and to architectural and urban design. In "A Theory of Architecture", Salingaros shows how a Pattern Language and a Form Language combine into an Adaptive Design Method. The discussion, while fairly abstract, digs at the scientific foundations of design, having more in common with Evolvable hardware than with the more philosophical discussions found in contemporary Architectural theory.

=== The fractal mind ===
The book discusses how the mind perceives and conceives architectural form, and postulates that fractal and other organizational mechanisms play a key role in perception. It then argues that humans naturally prefer fractal, organized structures, based on how the mind works. Most modern evolutionary biologists accept the idea that evolution is dependent on the geometry of the natural environment and thus must be consistent with biological structure and morphology. However, the view that selection has shaped the mind to prefer certain shapes and configurations is more controversial.

=== Geometrical fundamentalism ===
The phrase "geometrical fundamentalism" in this book was coined by Michael Mehaffy and Salingaros as a provocative way of expressing the dominance of abstract, monolithic forms of Modern architecture. Being easy to build, the author claims that those simple typologies are passed on globally and now dominate world architecture. One of the strengths of the International Style was that the design solutions were indifferent to location, size, and climate. Nevertheless, by not allowing architectural forms the freedom to adapt to a particular set of local circumstances, the built environment has tended further and further away from Sustainability.

=== Meme encapsulation ===
The book also coins the term "encapsulation" to describe an architectural meme bundled inside a social meme. The model suggests that such memetic replication models human culture, in which building and urban typologies proliferate for reasons other than their utility. The contention is that typologies that are passed on are the ones whose encapsulation is more appealing. Salingaros and Terry Mikiten propose that encapsulation helps an architectural meme to survive and reproduce. In particular, phenomena such as (possibly impractical) architectural fashions, where clients enable certain memes that do not promote mental health and feelings of well-being to reproduce, can be explained as encapsulations helping their enclosed memes to replicate. The converse is also true: an adaptive architectural typology, such as found in older vernacular architectures, is often avoided because it is encapsulated within a socially negative label (e.g. not "progressive" enough). The author claims that when looked at from the point of view of meme encapsulation and selection, many architectural phenomena that were difficult to explain become easier to understand.
