= Rebecca B. Alston =

American artist (born 1951)

- Born: May 12, 1951 (age 75); Mississippi, United States
- Education: Auburn University, B.F.A.; Kansas State University, M.Arch; New York University, Post Graduate; Harvard Graduate Professional Program, GSD
- Known for: Interdisciplinary Multimedia, Artist and Architectural Design
- Website: www.rebeccaalstonstudio.com

Rebecca B. Alston (born May 12, 1951) is an American artist known for interdisciplinary visual art and architectural design through her experimental and investigative approach to form, media, and processes. She has produced a wide range of works including paintings, drawings, prints, wall reliefs, and custom-designed forms. A significant focus of Alston's work has been the study and application of color, explored through psychological, environmental, and musical lenses. She spent much of her professional life in New York City and has been associated with movements such as Postmodernism and, more specifically, Deconstructivism. Influenced by the Avant-garde in her early years, Alston's later work became increasingly associated with Neo-modernism by exploring the interaction of form and color through evolving methodologies. Alston grew up in the Gulf Coast regions of Mississippi and Louisiana.

Alston's work has been presented in solo exhibitions across the United States and internationally, including in the Netherlands, London, Brazil and Tokyo. Her works are held in both private and public collections, including the National Museum of Women in the Arts in Washington, D.C., Museum of Geometric and MADI Art in Dallas.,. Mississippi Museum of Art in Mississippi, and the Jule Collins Smith Museum of Fine Art at Auburn University. She was awarded the Bronze Prize in the International Urban Art Plaza Competition by the Japanese government, the only U.S. recipient among 233 entrants from 40 countries. She is also recognized as an honored artist by the Mississippi Committee (MSC) of the National Museum of Women in the Arts and received a fellowship from the Woodstock School of Art.

== Education and background ==
Alston earned her B.F.A. from Auburn University and completed a Master of Architecture at Kansas State University. Her research focused on the perceptual intersections of color, light, music, and sound. During this time, she also studied under Max Lüscher.

In 1985, Alston established her own firm, Rebecca Alston Inc. Her firm's work was featured in publications in the U.S. and Japan.

== Bodies of work ==
=== The Interaction of Color and Form ===
In the mid-1970s, Alston developed a geometric system influenced by the Bauhaus, though her color palette diverged from its traditions. Early works explored serigraph printmaking and geometric abstraction. Influences included Josef Albers, Johannes Itten, Frans Gerritsen, and other modern color theorists.

=== Parative (Partitive) Ambiance ===
This series focused on perceptual relationships between color/light and music/sound, influenced by Alston's experience with chromesthesia. Developed between 1978 and 1980, the project included perceptual testing in Kansas State's Heliodome which offered light and sound control. The work was later exhibited at the A.R.C. in Manhattan, Kansas, where Alston connected with other artists such as Manfred Mohr who were also exploring art and science intersections. Alston's Parative Ambiance laid the groundwork for further exploration into sensory ecology — coined by Peter Frank. These studies later informed her proposals for sensory-stimulus environments, including medical facilities for patients with extended isolation needs.

=== NASA/Landset/Space Scapes ===
Between 1980 and 1983, Alston spent time in NASA technology labs at Kansas University, studying infrared imaging and environmental analysis for a deeper knowledge understanding of color/light and land analysis. These experiences informed her Spacescapes and Landset series, featuring printmaking techniques and layered media such as Kodalith film and oil. Works like Luna, Luna II, and Luna's Passion explored lunar landscapes, while the Landset series applied color theory to simulated aerial and satellite imagery, emphasizing environmental change.

=== The Constructivist: Reconstructivism & Deconstructivism ===
The Constructivist: Reconstructivism & Deconstructivism reflects emphasis of Alston's engagement with geometric abstraction and technological history. Comprising mixed media, wood reliefs, and oil paintings, the series was exhibited in Reconstructivism: New Geometric Painting (1995) at Space 504 in New York City, curated by Peter Frank. Frank described Alston's work as "combining spatial confidence with expressive abstraction," and praised her ability to "infuse emotion into formal structures."

=== Urban Art ===
The Urban Art series, consisting of mixed media on paper, oil, and acrylic on canvas, investigates a perspective on the relationship between built environments and natural systems. The mixed media works explore overlapping urban plans, often viewed from an aerial perspective. Pieces created include the Node, which was originally developed for a New York City subway art competition and was influenced by Kevin Lynch's Image of the City. It highlights an abstract experience of mass transit systems through layered movement and form. Urban Art marked a shift from rigid shapes of the grid toward compositions derived from chaotic or organic development, highlighting the fascination with change as a defining force in urban landscapes. Another influence during this time was from a book titled A Pattern Language by Christopher Alexander, Sara Ishikawa and Murray Silverstein. Pieces from this series are in the permanent collection of the Mississippi Committee of the National Museum of Women in the Arts, the Museum of Geometric and MADI Art, the Jule Smith Collins Museum of Art, and the Mississippi Museum of Art.

=== Convergence ===
The Convergence series explores a more introspective phase in Alston's practice, emphasizing spiritual and intuitive elements. Her time around temple architecture and cultural materials in Thailand and Southeast Asia influenced her work, leading to pieces incorporating crushed garnet, pumice, acrylic paint, and other textural materials. Light plays a central role in activating the pieces, which change in appearance depending on environmental conditions. This series reflects a simplification of form and a meditative, mantra-like rhythm, creating compositions that are sensory, tactile, and contemplative. The series was well shown in her exhibitions at Island Weiss Gallery and the International Armory Exhibition New York City.

=== Bio Forms ===
Alston's mixed media drawings and paintings in Bio Forms draws on intuitive and scientific references and natural aesthetics.

=== Earth's Voice ===
The Earth's Voice includes the work, It Is Time to Have a Dialogue About Our Ecosystems, created in response to the 2010 British Petroleum (BP) oil spill in the Gulf of Mexico. Alston created the piece while living and working in Sag Harbor, New York.

Works from Earth's Voice were exhibited at the Tambaran Art Gallery in 2020 and the Octavia Art Gallery in 2024.

=== Digital and AI developments ===
==== Experimental Sub Sets of Earth's Voice ====
Alston's exploration into digital and artificial intelligence-based art emerged from a personal experience with technology. While attempting develop of her mixed media files, she worked with a technician in India who installed an AI program that began tracking her digital movements and vector calculations.

From this process, she developed Algae Interaction, derived from her earlier mixed media drawings Algae 1 & 2, and later expanded into the Plankton series. These pieces blend AI-manipulated digital panels with tactile elements such as glass beads, polymers, and acrylics. Plankton and the Deep Blue, a two-panel work, juxtaposes a digital transformation on one side with richly textured materials on the other, continuing techniques seen in her Convergence series.

Works from this digital series were featured in the solo exhibition From Idea to Icon: The Origin of an Artwork at the Duckett Gallery of The Mary C. O'Keefe Cultural Arts Center

Exhibition curator Patricia Pinson said:

"Alston has explored the concept and meaning of color as a major thrust of her artistic career. She allows the color to speak with all of its implications — psychologically, environmentally, and musically."

== Notable work ==
=== Nike Headquarters (1984): Development of Color System and Design Development (Based on Parative Ambiance) ===
In 1984, Alston joined Michael Lynn and Associates (MLA) as a senior designer. While at MLA, she contributed to the renovation and restoration of Nike's New York City headquarters.

=== International Urban Art Design Plaza (1992) ===
In 1992, Alston was awarded the Bronze Prize for Excellence in Design Space by the Japanese Government for her entry in the International Urban Art Design Plaza competition held in Nagoya, Japan.

== Exhibitions ==
=== Solo exhibitions ===
- 1976: Deposit Guaranty Plaza in Jackson, MS
- 1980: Farrell Exhibition in Manhattan, KS
- 1982-83: Multi Media/Parative (Partitive) Ambiance 2D & 3D. The Heliodome Exhibition in Manhattan, KS
- 1983: Luna, Landsat, & Environmental Form. Strecker Gallery in Manhattan, KS
- 1983: Parative Ambiance. Mississippi Museum of Art in Biloxi, MS
- 1983: Aurora Gallery in Gulfport, MS
- 1988: L'elan Vitale Gallery in New York, NY
- 1989: Lorenzo Di Mauro in New York, NY
- 1989: The Mohr Exhibition in New York, NY
- 1990: Winfield Gallery in Gulfport, MS
- 1991: Rockefeller Center in New York, NY
- 1992: Barnard Biderman Gallery in New York, NY
- 1993: Elise Goodheart Fine Arts in Sag Harbor, NY
- 1995-99: Space 504 Gallery in New York, NY
- 1995: Space 504 Gallery in New York, NY
- 1996: Galerie Artline in Amsterdam, Netherlands
- 2000: The Society for Arts in Chicago, IL
- 2002: Jefferson Davis Gallery in Gulfport, MS
- 2005: Orlov Arts in New York, NY
- 2006: Island Weiss Gallery in New York, NY
- 2007: Island Weiss Gallery in New York, NY
- 2008: 1900 to Contemporary. Park Avenue Art 20 Expo. The International Art Fair in New York, NY
- 2014-15: One Woman Retrospective: Over 80 works of art from the bodies of Earth's Voice, Bio Forms, Convergence and Urban Art. Walter Anderson Museum of Art in Ocean Springs, MS
- 2015: Armstrong De Graaf International Fine Art in Douglas, MI
- 2018-19: Tambaran Gallery 2 in New York, NY
- 2019-21: Drawing to Artificial Intelligence, Tambaran Gallery 2 in New York, NY
- 2019: Ohr Museum Of Art in Biloxi, MS
- 2020: From Idea to Icon: The Origin of an Artwork - One Woman Exhibition, The Mary C. Cultural Center, The Duckett Gallery in Ocean Springs, MS
- 2022: Waveland Gallery in Waveland, MS
- 2023: ArtSource Loft in New York, NY

=== Selected group exhibitions ===
- 1972: Jackson County College in Gautier, MS
- 1975: Auburn University Gallery in Auburn, AL
- 1978: Deposit Guaranty Plaza in Jackson, MS
- 1980: The Art Connection in Kansas City, MO
- 1981: Art Research Center (A.R.C.) in Kansas City, MO
- 1982: Kansas City Artist Coalition in Kansas City, KS
- 1982: Kansas State University in Manhattan, KS
- 1982: McClain Exhibition (KSU) Manhattan, Kansas
- 1982: Strecker Gallery in Manhattan, KS
- 1983: Cabo Frio International in Rio de Janeiro, Brazil
- 1983: IAC Inc. in Los Angeles, CA
- 1983: Kansas 3 in Topeka, KS
- 1983: Lawrence Gallery in Kansas City, KS
- 1985: Nike Exhibition in New York, NY
- 1987: Galleria in Tucson, Arizona
- 1987: Mori Art Center Gallery in Tokyo, Japan
- 1988 New Kings Road Gallery in London, England
- 1988: Anna Bornholt Gallery in London, England
- 1988: Texas Art League in Jasper, Texas
- 1989: Art Who Gallery in Ocean Springs, MS
- 1990: Changing Systems With Our Environment. Strecker Gallery in Manhattan, KS
- 1991: Molica Guidarte Gallery (Italian Gallery) in New York, NY
- 1992: Auburn University Gallery in Auburn, AL
- 1993: Woods Art Gallery (University of Southern Mississippi) in Hattiesburg, MS
- 1995: Color and Form. Space 504 in New York, NY
- 1995: Decon Recon-stuctivism Exhibition, curated by Peter Frank. Sponsored by Amsterdam Trust Corporation. Space 504 in New York, NY
- 1996: Exploring Dimensions. Space 504 in New York, NY
- 1996: Four Women Painters. Space 504 in New York, NY
- 1997: ALSTON •CUNNINGHAM • TRINCERE. Space 504 in New York, NY
- 1998: Space 504 in New York, NY
- 2011: NO RULES. Dorian Grey Gallery in New York, NY
- 2018: Art Basel. Tambaran Gallery in New York, NY
- 2019-20: Solar Print Making - Traveling Exhibition. South Hampton Art Center in Southampton, NY
- 2023: NO.12 / A.R.C. GROUP '55 Anniversary. Konstruktiv.ist via Istanbul/International (Virtual Exhibition)

== Collections ==
=== Permanent collections ===
- National Museum of Women in the Arts in Washington, D.C.
- Museum of Geometric and MADI Art in Dallas, Texas
- Jule Collins Smith Museum of Fine Art in Auburn, Alabama
- Mississippi Museum of Art in Jackson, MS

=== Environmental installations ===
- Kalem Environment. New York, NY (1998)
- Battery Park City Environment, Art Environment. New York, NY (1987)
- Environmental Color for Nike Headquarters. New York, NY (1984)
