= Sala House =

Coordinates: 37°53′32.07″N 122°18′18.51″W

The Sala House is located on Albany Hill in Albany, California. It is the first house in the United States designed and built by architect Christopher Alexander. Built in 1983 and 1984, the Sala House was a collaboration of Alexander and Gary Black, who at the time were architecture professors at the University of California, Berkeley, working together with Bob Smith, David Tuttle, Seth Wachtel, and Andre and Anna Sala. The house was built to be the home for Andre and Anna Sala and their two children. A second wing was added in 1988.

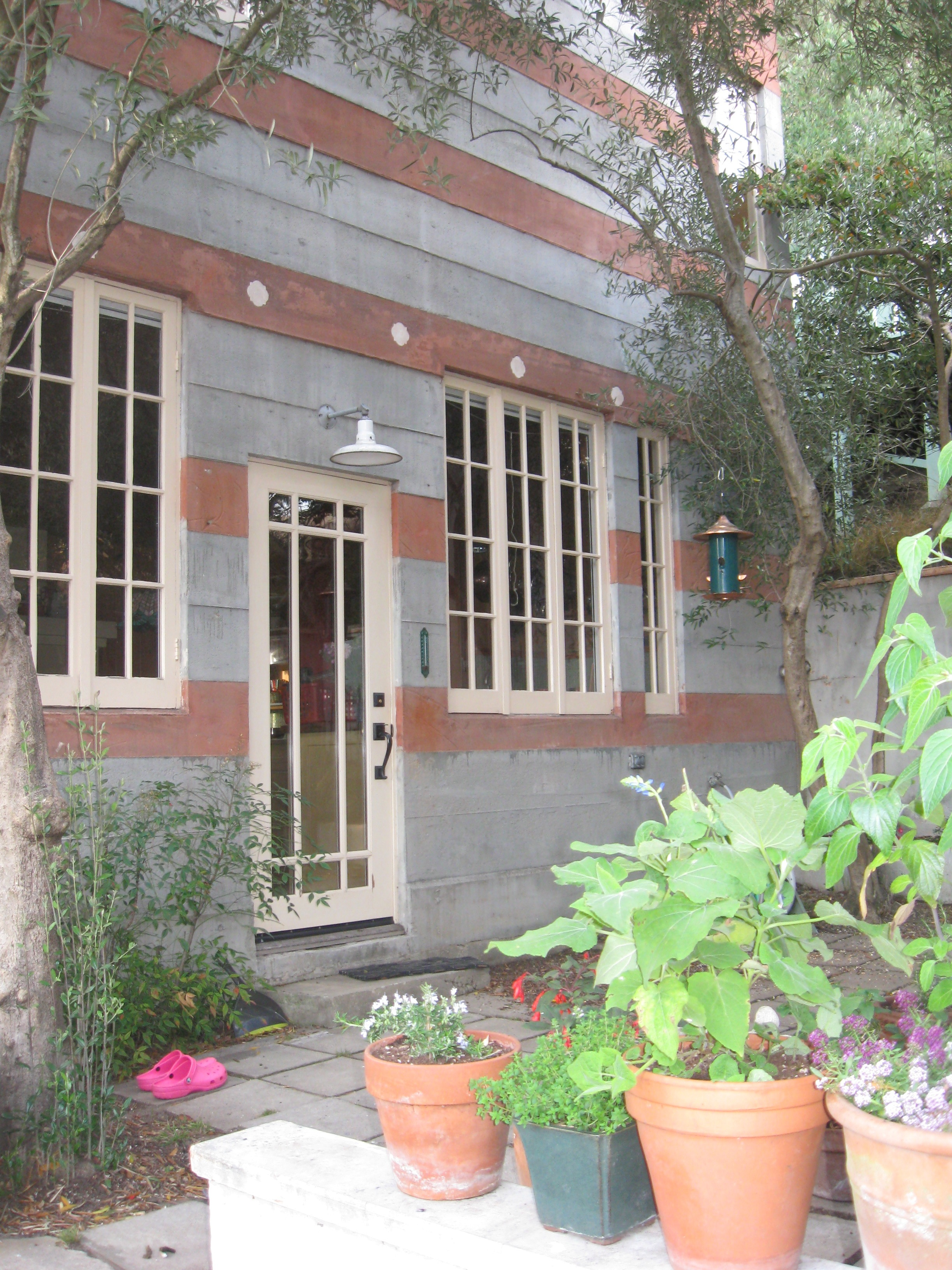
Kitchen door to the Sala House, Albany, California

== Design and construction ==
The process of building the Sala House reflected "the client’s central role and self-empowerment, a construction deeply and fundamentally rooted to its site, structure uniquely fitted to the requirements, and a methodology never imposed from the drawing board."

Discussing the Sala House in a 1986 article for Architectural Review, Dorit Fromm wrote:

"[T]he act of design and construction is recast into a 'search' for wholeness and balance. The method is similar to painting, in which each new stroke of the brush tries to harmonize with what is already on the canvas. In building, instead of plans and requirements ruling the process, the first question that arises is one of balance, comfort and harmony. Perception of the emerging design is concentrated on what will enhance the structure. Composition is not solidified a la Beaux Arts; instead every detail—be it window placement or a step detail—is finalized on site and in relationship to what is there. This, to most architects and contractors, is a very odd notion."

Design commenced with Christopher Alexander asking Andre Sala to close his eyes and describe "the most beautiful and comfortable room you can remember." The center of the home is a farmhouse-style kitchen based on Andre Sala's memory of the farmhouse that he had visited as a boy in the south of France.

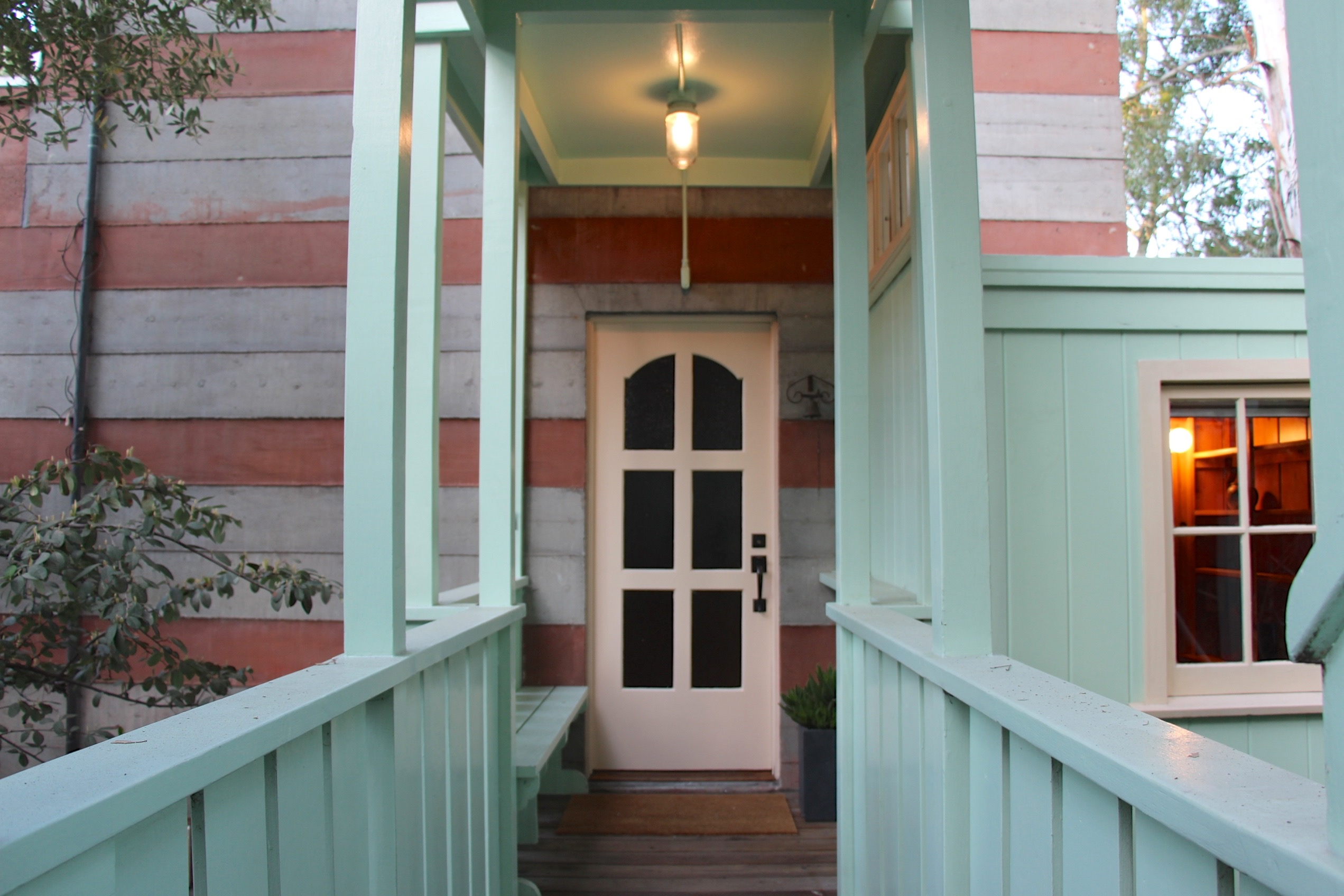
Entrance to the Sala House

While the overall form of the house was planned in advance, many design decisions were made as building progressed. For example, the placement of windows and the height of ceilings was determined on site by first creating mockups in cardboard. Christopher Alexander said the mockups were considered not by a standard of "Do I like it?", but by considering "In all the variations I can think of, which is the one that makes me feel most wholesome, most whole in myself?" The house has been described as a “realisation of a working technique to install those qualities that go beyond stylistic capriciousness to comfort, simplicity and a deep sense of well-being.”

== Materials ==
The house is noted for an unusual use of materials. With a post-and-beam structure, the exterior of the house is a one-and-one-half-inch concrete shell in striped pink and grey that echoes the colors of the eucalyptus near the home. The color was added to the concrete at the time of pouring. The concrete is not load bearing but provides a shear wall. The concrete shell also provides a substantial passive solar effect even though it is outside of a layer of Styrofoam. The interior walls, floors, and ceiling are knotty pine.

The pouring of the concrete shell turned out to be surprisingly time consuming. In building the second wing of the house, a similar structure was achieved with the use of gunite. This process was developed on another building built by Alexander in Martinez, California.

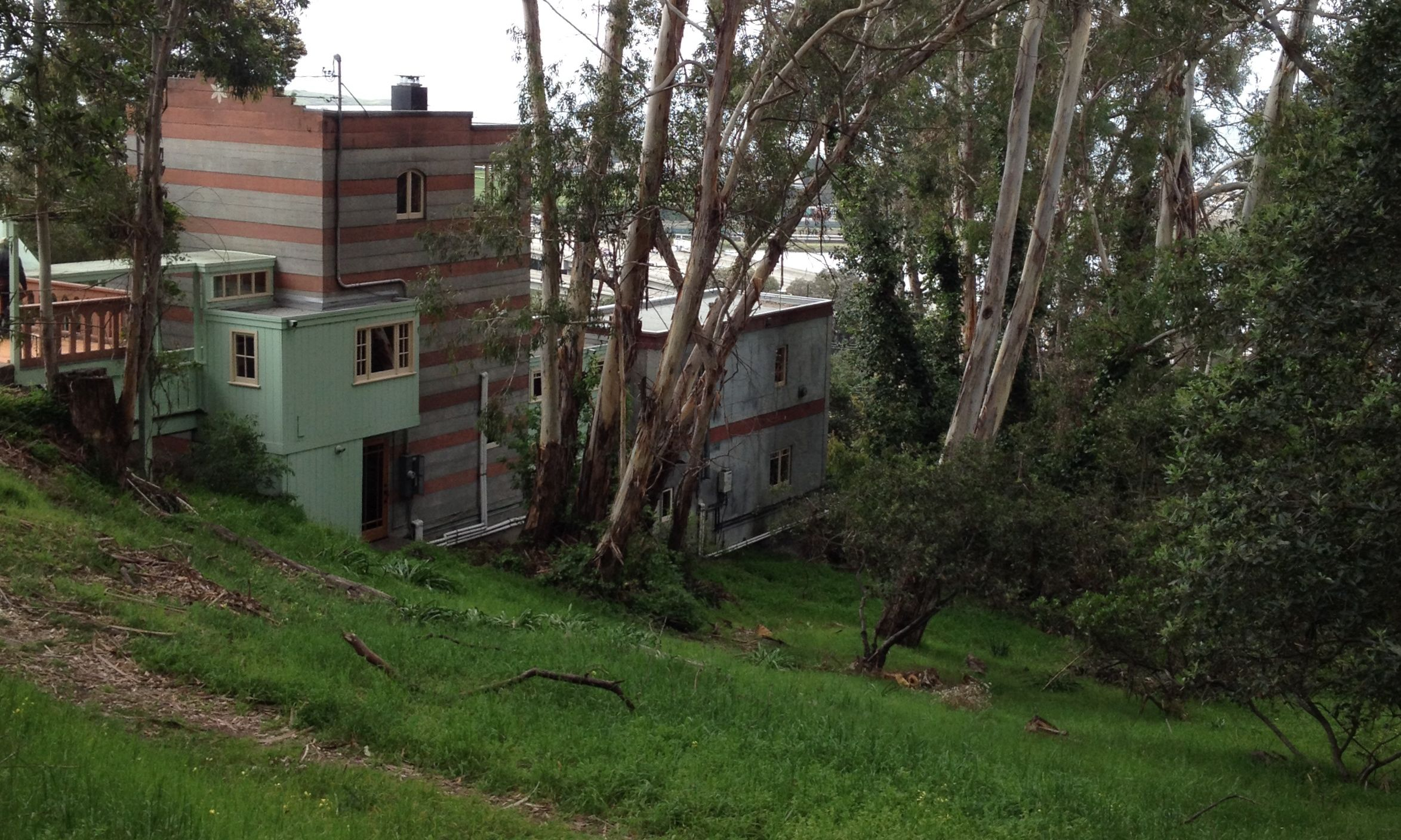
The Sala House in Albany, California, from the northeast.

The kitchen has a terrazzo floor with decorative patterns that were made with Styrofoam forms, marble dust, marble chips and cement. The colors and pattern were the result of Alexander working on his hands and knees on the site with colored pieces of construction paper.

The kitchen also has a Rumford fireplace rendered in concrete, rather than brick.

== Relation to A Pattern Language ==
Alexander's 1977 book with Sara Ishikawa and Murray Silverstein, A Pattern Language, remains decades after publication one of the best-selling books on architecture; it describes a network of 253 patterns drawn from traditional construction that relate to design at every scale, including regions, cities, and neighborhoods, as well as houses, rooms, and gardens. The Sala House incorporates many of the named patterns from A Pattern Language, including:

No. 112 "Entrance Transition" and No. 113 "Car Connection." From the street, the house is approached down wooden stairs and across a small bridge with the entrance on the second floor.

No. 130 "Entrance Room" and No. 242 "Front Door Bench." There is seating both outside and inside the entrance.

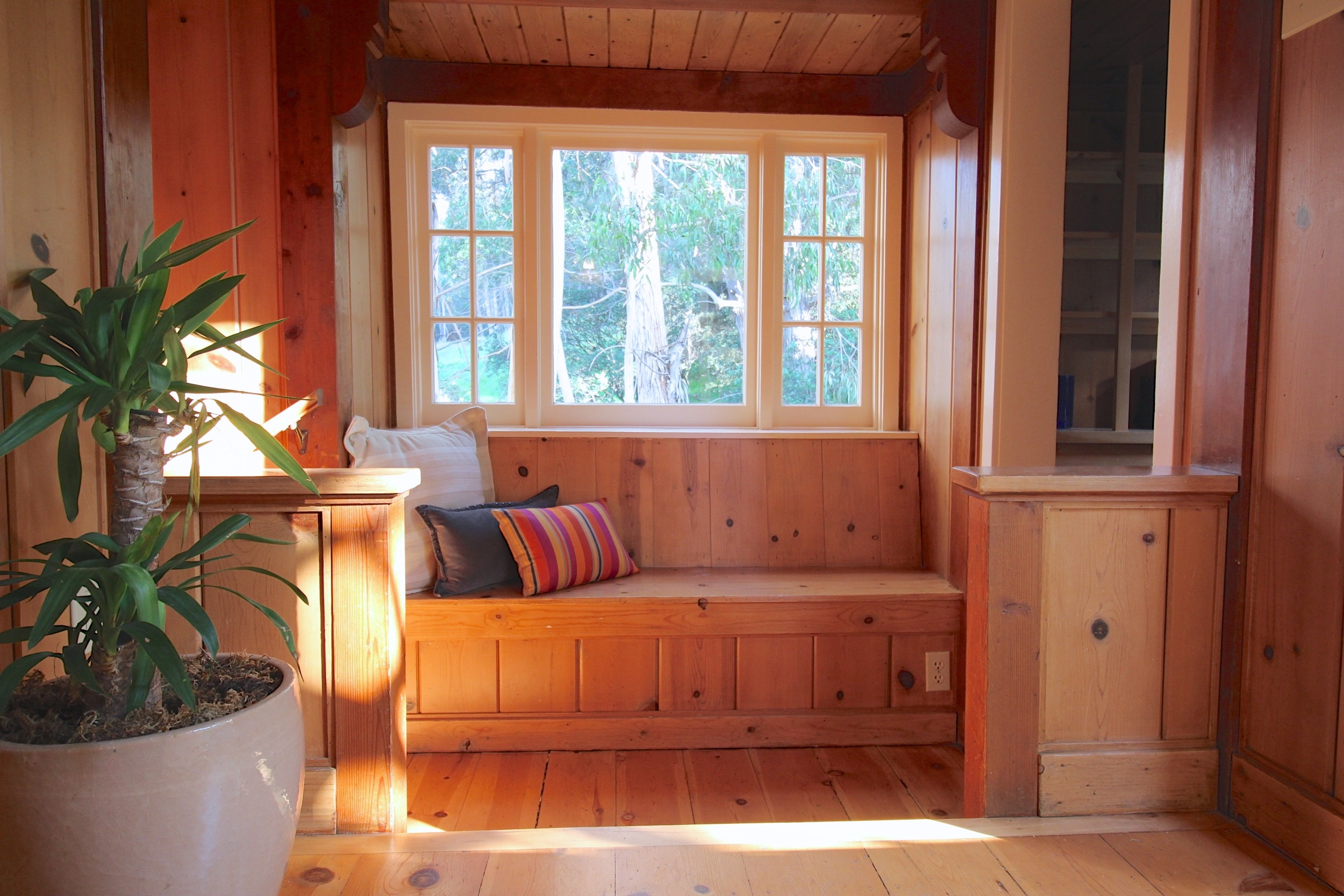
Entrance Room to the Sala House

No. 136 "The Couple's Realm," No. 137, "Children's Realm," No. 143, "Bed Cluster," No. 179, "Alcove," No. 187 "Marriage Bed," No. 188 "Bed Alcove," and No. 203 "Child Caves." The second floor has a small bathroom and a room designated “The Children’s Realm.” The third floor is “The Parents’ Realm.” Both rooms have sleeping alcoves. The Parents’ Realm has a sitting alcove and separate work rooms; the Children’s Realm has a play area.

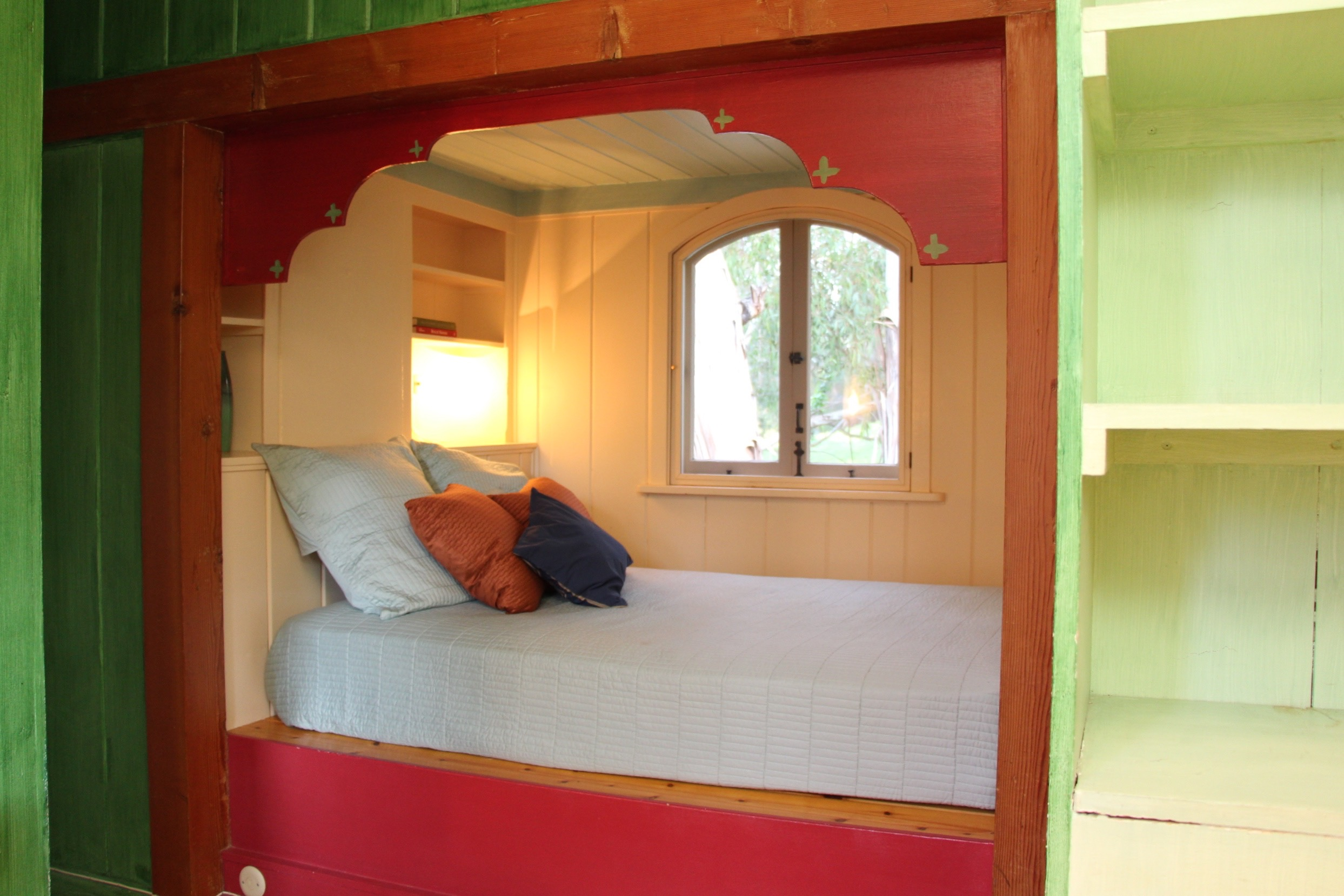
Marriage Bed in the Sala House

No. 161, "Sunny Place," No. 168 "Connection to the Earth," No. 169 "Terraced Slope," No. 170 "Fruit Trees," No. 171 "Tree Places," No. 172 "Garden Growing Wild," No. 173 "Garden Wall," and No. 176 "Garden Seat." Outside the kitchen is a walled garden space with olive trees. Steps lead down to two terraces created by curved parapet benches.

No. 135 "Tapestry of Light and Dark," No. 139, "Farmhouse Kitchen," No. 181, "The Fire," No. 192 "Windows Overlooking Life," No. 239, "Small Panes," and No. 249 "Ornament."

== Sources ==
- Dorit Fromm, "An Approach to Wholeness," The Architectural Review (Feb. 1986)
- Nora Gallagher, “Coming Home: The Making of a House”, Image (Apr. 27, 1986)
- "P/A Profile: Christopher Alexander," Progressive Architecture (June 1986)
- "List of buildings – Christopher Alexander Curriculum Vitae". patternlanguage.com.
- William L. Hamilton, "The Spirit of Home," Metropolitan Home (Dec. 1988)
- "House plans for study". patternlanguage.com.
