= Nikos Salingaros =

Greek-Australian-American mathematician, architecture theorist and polymath

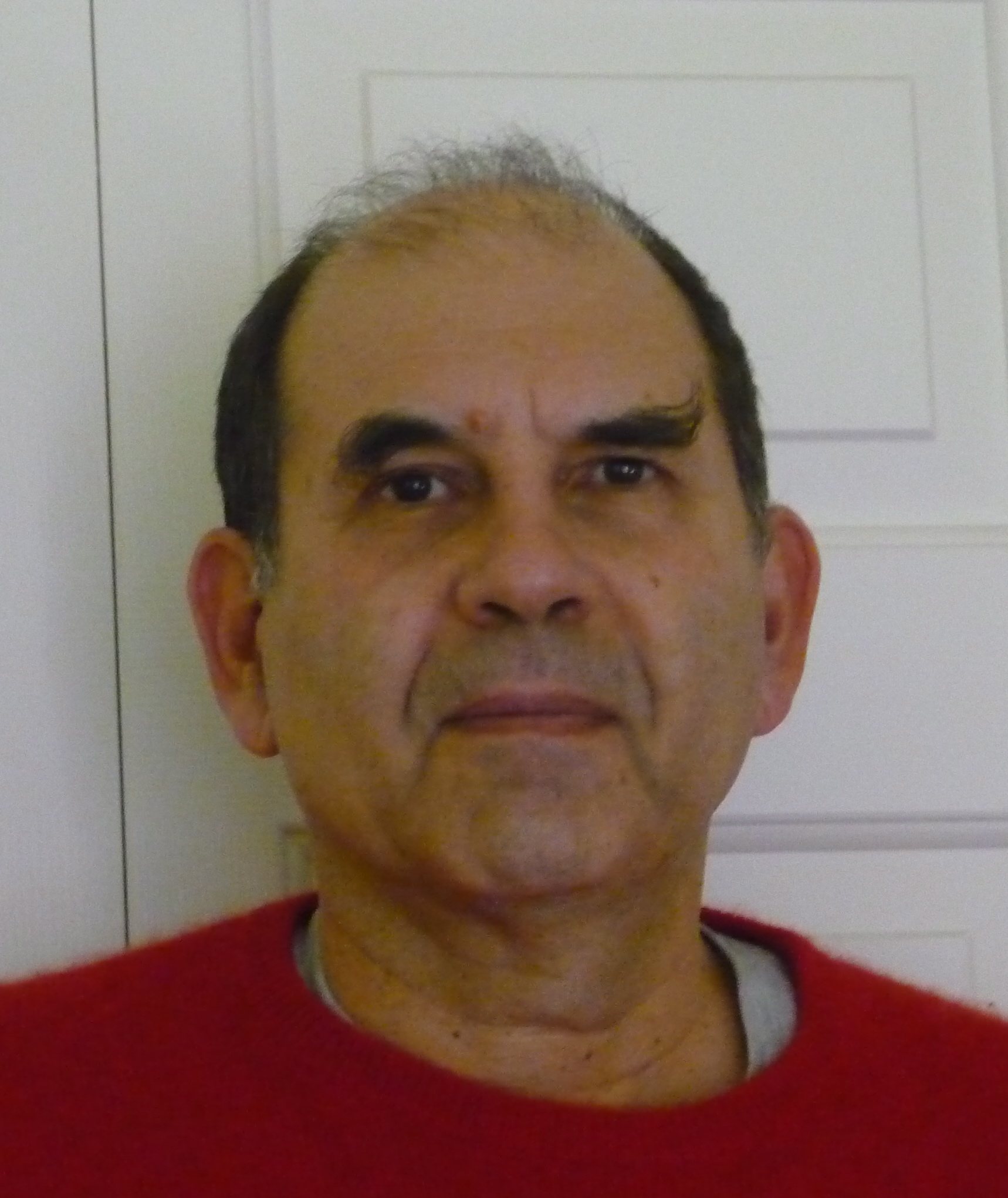
- Born: 1952 (age 73–74); Perth, Australia
- Education: Stony Brook University
- Scientific career
- Workplaces: University of Texas at San Antonio
- Thesis: Certain algebraic structures and their applications to physics (1978)

Nikos Angelos Salingaros (Greek: Νίκος Άγγελος Σαλίγκαρος; born 1952) is a mathematician and polymath known for his work on urban theory, architectural theory, complexity theory, and design philosophy. He has been a close collaborator of the architect Christopher Alexander, with whom Salingaros shares a harsh critical analysis of conventional modern architecture. Like Alexander, Salingaros has proposed an alternative theoretical approach to architecture and urbanism that is more adaptive to human needs and aspirations, and that combines rigorous scientific analysis with deep intuitive experience.

Salingaros published substantive research on algebras, mathematical physics, electromagnetic fields, and thermonuclear fusion before turning his attention to architecture and urbanism. Salingaros still teaches mathematics, and is Professor of Mathematics at the University of Texas at San Antonio. He is also on the Architecture faculties of universities in Italy, Mexico, and The Netherlands.

== Personal ==
Born to Greek parents, Salingaros is the only child of the popular composer Stelios Salingaros; he is also the nephew of the operatic baritone Spyros Salingaros (Greek: Σπύρος Σαλίγκαρος).

== Education ==
Salingaros began working in the arts as a painter, but soon switched to the sciences. He obtained a bachelor's degree in physics from the University of Miami, Florida. He took his Master's in 1974 and Doctorate in 1978 at the State University of New York at Stony Brook. In 1982, he started a long-term collaboration with Christopher Alexander, becoming one of the editors of The Nature of Order, Alexander's four-volume masterwork on aesthetics and the geometric processes of nature.

== Career ==
Salingaros joined the Mathematics faculty of the University of Texas at San Antonio in 1983, where he remains today. In the 1990s, Salingaros began to publish his own research on architectural and urban form. In 1997 he was recipient of the first award ever by the Alfred P. Sloan Foundation for research on architectural topics. In 2003, he was elected to the Committee of Honor, International Network for Traditional Building, Architecture & Urbanism (INTBAU), and to the INTBAU College of Traditional Practitioners.

== Writings ==
Salingaros' writings helped to introduce two key concepts in urban morphology, fractals and networks. His book Principles of Urban Structure has been compared to that of Michael Batty (United Kingdom) and Pierre Frankhauser (France) in describing cities as giant fractals, and the separate efforts of Paul Drewe (Holland) and Gabriel Dupuy (France) in describing cities as giant networks. His work links urban form to new concepts such as the small-world network and the scale-free network. Michael Batty, Bartlett Professor of Planning at University College London, wrote about Salingaros' contribution: "He shows how networks which evolve from the bottom up lead to ordered (scaled) hierarchies that are both efficient and well adjusted. … This is the theory of the small world, but contained within, there is the germ of an idea which has barely been exploited. In connecting elements in cities, there is a natural ordering from many short links which aggregate to a lesser number of longer links which, in my view, could be linked to small worlds, to scale-free networks, to power law distributions and, more significantly, to changes in transportation technology. Salingaros is the first to hint at this."

A Theory of Architecture, a collection of previously published papers, describes a set of guidelines for design, giving scientific principles that link forms to human sensibilities. In it he describes a practical architectural system in a form that any practicing architect can use. The work incorporates Salingaros' observations of the greatest buildings of the past, which he defines as those that are the most responsive to human sensibilities. While this method and its theoretical underpinning support traditional architectural typologies, Salingaros emphasizes that architects should be free to adapt their ideas to particular situations, leaving decisions to be influenced by the environment and needs of the project. He explores questions such as: How can ornament be justified, and why is it necessary? What are the ratios and hierarchies that promote neighborliness and beauty? What is it about our biological nature – perhaps even about the nature of matter itself – that makes us feel one thing in the presence of one kind of structure and something else in the presence of another? Speaking as a mathematician, he proposes a theoretical framework to answer these questions.

Anti-Architecture and Deconstruction is a collection of essays written as a polemic against contemporary "star" architecture, and its supporters within architectural academia and the architectural media. It is an impassioned indictment against the "bad architecture" that he argues has been promoted by their actions. Salingaros defines "bad architecture" as that which makes people uncomfortable or physically ill, and which pursues formal or ideological concerns instead of adapting to nature and to the needs of ordinary human beings.

"Social Housing in Latin America: A Methodology to Utilize Processes of Self-Organization", by Nikos Salingaros, David Brain, Andrés Duany, Michael Mehaffy, and Ernesto Philibert, outlined the role of socio-spatial relations in guaranteeing a successful built environment. The principal urbanist problem facing the world today concerns the socio-political processes in the planning and construction of social housing, as well as the large-scale renovation of favelas. This paper identified urban space that is loved by its inhabitants, enough to be defended against encroachment and degradation, as a crucial concept. The criterion is an emotional one, and arises from the correct satisfaction of the residents' emotional needs through the appropriate urban morphology, which is in turn created only through user participation (in a bottom-up process guided by an NGO representative). This successful type of urban space rarely arises from the typologies of post-war planning.

Salingaros' newer writings focus on biophilia as an essential component of the design of the human environment, thus joining the ideas of Edward Osborne Wilson to Sustainable design.

== Influence ==
=== Architecture ===
Salingaros has had a significant theoretical influence on several major figures in architecture. Christopher Alexander, author of the seminal treatises A Pattern Language and Notes on the Synthesis of Form, describes Salingaros' influence: "In my view, the second person who began to explore the deep connection between science and architecture was Nikos Salingaros, one of the four Katarxis editors. He had been working with me helping me edit material in The Nature of Order, for years, and at some point—in the mid-nineties I think—began writing papers looking at architectural problems in a scientific way. Then by the second half of the nineties he began making important contributions to the building of this bridge, and to scientific explorations in architecture which constituted a bridge."

Charles III, an influential critic of contemporary architecture, expressed Salingaros' influence in his own preface to Salingaros' A Theory of Architecture: "Surely no voice is more thought-provoking than that of this intriguing, perhaps historically important, new thinker?"

=== Tall buildings ===
The End of Tall Buildings (2001), co-authored with James Kunstler, argued that the age of skyscrapers is at an end, and that 9/11 marks the beginning of the end of modernist typologies dominating urban form. While the world has not stopped building skyscrapers, this became one of the most cited and controversial essays on the topic. Referring to this essay, Benjamin Forgey of The Washington Post said: "What many are feeling today goes right to the marrow: the fear of being a target. And who today can deny that tall buildings such as the World Trade Center towers make ideal targets?"

=== Urbanism ===
Salingaros contributed to the New Athens Charter of 2003, which is meant to replace the original 1933 Athens Charter written principally by the highly influential modernist architect-planner Le Corbusier. That blueprint segregated urban functions and contributed to generating post-war urban typologies such as monoculture and sprawl. Through this and other writings Salingaros sought to retrofit suburbia, and reconnect US and European cities at the human scale. This work can be seen as allied with the New Urbanism movement to replace sprawling development with compact, walkable cities and towns.

Salingaros is involved in forming a community that applies analogous techniques of File sharing and Open-source software from computer science to urbanism. This movement, based upon Peer-to-peer principles, is aptly called P2P Urbanism, and combines user participation in design and the use of Design Patterns from Christopher Alexander with other methods found useful in handling complex software. A description, definition, and recent articles are published on the website of the Foundation for Peer to Peer Alternatives.

=== Computer science ===
Salingaros has never written a true software paper, yet two of his papers are quoted by the CS community. Both these papers were later included as chapters in the book Principles of Urban Structure.

The Structure of Pattern Languages (2000) argues that patterns (a concept central to the design pattern movement in CS and introduced by Alexander) encapsulate information about recurring design solutions and human activities. Techniques for linking observed patterns validate a Pattern language, and dismiss stylistic rules and antipatterns as arbitrary. E. Todd, E. Kemp and C. Phillips commented: "Salingaros shows that a loose collection of patterns is not a system, because it lacks connections, implying that the quality and nature of the connections between patterns is what determines whether a collection is a language or not. He identifies two forms of connectivity when discussing pattern languages: external connectivity and internal connectivity. These two forms of connection are central to validating a pattern language. Salingaros implies that the richness of connections between levels and within levels in a pattern language is a factor in determining a language’s internal validity."

The Information Architecture of Cities (co-authored with L. Andrew Coward, 2004) Ref. describes cities as systems of informational architecture, in which high-level functionality separates the system into communicating modules. Information exchange in urban systems includes visual input from the environment, personal contact, telecommunications, and the movement of people. Journeys by residents through a city accomplish a primary information exchange (the interaction that is the intent of the journey). But ideally, journeys have secondary, serendipitous information exchange. For example, a pedestrian on the way to work visits shops, sees advertisements, buys a newspaper, encounters a friend and has a quick word. The virtue of cities is this dense, fractal, multilayered information exchange. It is closely related to the generation of economic wealth and culture within cities.

In "The Information Architecture of Cities" Salingaros also defined the useful notion of "fractal loading", later picked up by Richard Veryard, Phil Jones, and others in Computer Science.

=== Complexity ===
Salingaros introduced a model of Complexity by using an analogy with thermodynamic quantities in physics, later developed in collaboration with the Computer Scientist Allen Klinger. This work adopted the notion of Herbert A. Simon that what is important is the organization of complexity, and it proposed a simple means to measure it. Christopher Alexander discussed Salingaros' model in Book 1 of The Nature of Order: "I believe it is important to show this result simply to underline the fact that living structure is, in principle, susceptible to mathematical treatment, and may therefore be regarded as a part of physics."

=== Philosophy ===
Salingaros has been a harsh critic of deconstructivism in architecture, and its uncritical application of the philosophy of post-structuralism. His essay "The Derrida Virus" argues that the ideas of the French philosopher Jacques Derrida, applied in an uncritical way, effectively form an information "virus" that dismantles logical thought and knowledge. Salingaros employs the meme model earlier introduced by Richard Dawkins to explain the transmission of ideas. In so doing he provides a model that validates earlier claims by philosopher Richard Wolin that Derrida's philosophy is logically nihilistic. Even though Salingaros uses Dawkins' ideas, he nevertheless strongly disagrees with Dawkins' evaluation of religion as just another meme, as expounded in Dawkins' book The God Delusion. Supporting Alexander's most recent work tying religion to geometry, Salingaros argues for the important historic contribution of religious tradition to human understanding, both in architecture and in philosophy.

=== General ===
Salingaros has been included in "50 VISIONARIES who are changing your world", published in the November–December 2008 edition of Utne Reader. This is the first follow-up of the 2001 Utne Reader book "(65) VISIONARIES: people and ideas to change your life", which included Jane Jacobs, Andrés Duany, Elizabeth Plater-Zyberk, Muhammad Yunus, Fritjof Capra, Edward Goldsmith, and William McDonough.

== Bibliography ==
- "The Derrida Virus". Telos 126 (Winter 2003). New York: Telos Press.
- Anti-Architecture and Deconstruction (2004; 2nd Ed 2007)
- Principles of Urban Structure (2005)
- A Theory of Architecture (2006)
- The Future of Cities (in press 2007)

== See also ==
- Urban morphology § Morphogenetic School
