= Notes on the Synthesis of Form =

1964 book by Christopher Alexander

- Softcover edition
- Author: Christopher Alexander
- Language: English
- Subject: Architecture
- Genre: Nonfiction
- Publisher: Harvard University Press
- Publication date: 1964
- Publication place: United States
- Media type: Print
- Pages: 216
- ISBN: 0-674-62751-2
- OCLC: 16190773
- Dewey Decimal: 745.4
- LC Class: NK1505

Notes on the Synthesis of Form is a book by Christopher Alexander about the process of design.

== Design ==
Alexander defines design as "the process of inventing things which display new physical order, organization, form, in response to function...".

Even though his focus was formed in architectural design and civil engineering, the core ideas underlying his approach can be applied to many other fields.

Alexander's analysis of the village of Bavra, in Gujarat, India formed the major case study in the dissertation and the book.

== Influence ==
By the time it was published, the book was considered "one of the most important contemporary books about the art of design, what it is, and how to go about it."

The book influenced a number of leading software writers, including Larry Constantine, Ed Yourdon, Alan Cooper, and Tom DeMarco.

== Alexander's later work ==
For some reasons – perhaps related to the mathematical difficulties he faced or to the paradigm shift taking place in the design methods movement through the 1960s and 1970s, or argument by the German designer Horst Rittel that design deals with 'wicked problems' that do not have well defined boundaries or rationales, and cannot be solved with rigid methodology advocated in Notes – Alexander did not continue to develop the formal parts of his approach, which, by that time, showed promise. Instead, he chose, temporarily, to work on patterns (A Pattern Language) together with other well-known architects (Sara Ishikawa and Murray Silverstein). These patterns are visible or material manifestations of the driving forces underlying the synthesis of form. For an example, consider the following excerpt from the part one of the book (page 15):

The ultimate object of design is form. The reason that iron filings placed in a magnetic field exhibit a pattern – have form – is that the field they are in is not homogeneous...

Nevertheless, what matters here is not only the form itself but the forces induced by the magnetic field. The fact that the magnetic field induces certain kind of form is relevant for some purposes; however, there are many practical applications not related to form. The equations describing the magnetic field can be translated into many useful outputs, to which, the concept denoted here by term "pattern" is a corresponding material manifestation or articulation. In his most recent work, The Nature of Order, Alexander demonstrates that it is illogical to separate formal manifestations from the underlying processes or sequences which produce the form, as both are observable aspects of the same field, thereby resolving the apparent conflict between this work and his subsequent pattern research.

== See also ==
- Pattern language
