= Souk Haraj (Lebanon) =

Historic market in Tripoli, Lebanon

Coordinates: 34°26′14.7″N 35°50′46.0″E

Souk Haraj stands as one of the most important Mamluk souks in Tripoli, Lebanon, and a prominent historical monument in the city. It lies to the southeast of Al-Saghah Street, situated in the northern end of the old city – known for its wealth of souks and khans – specifically in Bab Al-Hadid neighborhood, east of Souk Al-Bazerkan next to Al-Tawbah Mosque.

The historians believe that it is called "Haraj" in reference to the Arabic term "Mouharaja" which means "Auctioning", as goods were displayed and sold by auction. The name "Souk Haraj" was given to a two-story Khan (known as Caravanserai): the lower floor is used for displaying goods and the upper floor is dedicated for sleeping quarters.

Scholars trace the construction of the souk back to the Mamluk period as historical references indicate that the souk was established as a Waqf (endowment) owned by a man known as Manjak Pasha in the middle of the fourteenth century.

The Souk contains a row of stalls that reflect the Mamluk heritage; at present it is dedicated to selling traditional Tripolitan's crafts and handmade goods such as pillows, mattresses, reed mats, cotton wares, leather goods, woodwork.

Souk Haraj that is considered one of the most venerable Tripolitan's covered souks, is renowned for it simple yet distinctive architectural design as Greek and Roman stones were used in its construction.

It is assumed that the souk was built on the ruins of a Crusader church with some of its arches and columns incorporated into its construction.

The souk features two monumental columns of towering height bearing arches of ancient architectural artistry and it is crowned by intersecting vaults resting on fourteen granite columns without decorative capitals.

It is worth noting that Souk Haraj reflects the ancient mercantile spirit of Tripoli where tourist and visitors meander through the historical soul of the city due to its proximity to other archeological and historical landmarks such as Khan Al-Saboun (Soap Caravanserai) and Hamam Izze-Eddine (Izze-Eddine bathhouse).

Many historians and travelers who visited Tripoli have documented these historic commercial souks, among them the scholar Abdul Ghani Naboulsi.
