= Living Villages =

Living Villages is an organisation in the United Kingdom established in 1993 as part of The Athena Foundation UK (now dissolved) and as The Living Village Trust in 1997 by Carole Salmon and Bob Tomlinson. The objectives are to encourage sustainable development through appropriate design and ethical commercial practice. The first project of five environmentally friendly houses called Bells Court in Bishops Castle, Shropshire, UK built in 1997, and the 40 house eco-neighbourhood called The Wintles, also in Bishops Castle, were designed to demonstrate that new housing can be eco-friendly, attractive and beneficial to a local community.

== History ==
Living Villages was established in 1993 as a non-profit, prompted by positive responses to a proposal for an eco-village based on Permaculture principles and design inspired by Christopher Alexander's A Pattern Language.

They started the Wintles project in 1999 as a new pedestrian neighbourhood with a high degree of self-sufficiency for the town of Bishops Castle on 17 acres which included houses, shared gardens, allotments for food production, woodland and amenity areas which include a labyrinth orchard designed by Keith Critchlow. Architects Pat Borer and David Lee worked on the initial layout with contributions from Christopher Alexander and Leon Krier, but the final designs were produced by Bob Tomlinson and became the working model for the design principles. Ecostruct were the building partners.

In 2007, Living Villages won the Housebuilder of the Year Award for The Wintles.

The Wintles was cited by Planning Minister Nick Boles as one of the UK Government's favourite housing schemes.
