= The Timeless Way of Building =

1979 book by Christopher Alexander

- Author: Christopher Alexander
- Subject: Architecture
- Publisher: Oxford University Press
- Publication date: 1979
- Pages: 552
- ISBN: 0-19-502402-8
- LC Class: NA2500.A450
- Followed by: A Pattern Language

The Timeless Way of Building is a 1979 book by Christopher Alexander that proposes a new theory of architecture (and design in general) that relies on the understanding and configuration of design patterns. Although it came out later, it is essentially the introduction to A Pattern Language and The Oregon Experiment, providing the philosophical background to the Center for Environmental Structure series.

It has had a huge influence on creative thinking, especially in the areas of architecture and software design.

== Summary ==
In the book, Alexander introduces the concept of the "quality without a name", and argues that we should seek to include this nameless quality in our buildings. Alexander attempts to define the idea by surrounding it with existing concepts that reflect a part of the quality with no name but are not sufficient to define it individually.

It is written as a long series of italicized headlines followed by short sections providing more detail; as Alexander suggests in the foreword, the 552-page book can be read in an hour by only reading the headlines, which frame the book's argument. There are also numerous full-page photo illustrations throughout the book, some of which are referenced by the text and some of which are simply an additional visual argument to complement the words.

The style used in The Timeless Way of Building is also unusual for an architectural text, at times resembling prose poetry or religious scripture. Indeed, some consider it not primarily an architectural work at all but "a book on philosophy with architectural examples."

Other books in the same series are:

- A Pattern Language (volume 2)
- The Oregon Experiment (volume 3)
