= The Oregon Experiment =

1975 book

- First edition
- Author: Christopher Alexander
- Series: Center for Environmental Structure
- Subject: Architecture
- Publisher: Oxford University Press
- Publication date: 1975
- Media type: Print
- Pages: 190
- ISBN: 978-0-19-501824-0
- OCLC: 1976594
- Preceded by: A Pattern Language

The Oregon Experiment is a 1975 book by Christopher Alexander and collaborators Murray Silverstein, Shlomo Angel, Sara Ishikawa, and Denny Abrams. It describes an experimental approach to campus community planning at the University of Oregon, in Eugene, Oregon which resulted in a theory of architecture and planning described in the group's later published and better-known volumes A Pattern Language and The Timeless Way of Building.

In the late 1960s and early 1970s, students and faculty at the University of Oregon protested against log trucks driving through campus; against the destruction of a 19th-century cemetery; against the military draft and the invasions and occupations in Southeast Asia; and against the idea that the university was acting in place of students' parents. On top of this, buildings created since the end of World War II included Brutalist architecture, which was aesthetically polarizing.

The campus community wanted more control over their lives, and their environment. The university administration took the conciliatory measure of hiring an award-winning, radical professor from University of California, Berkeley, to design a process by which the community of the university could create its own space. The University of Oregon became the experimental testbed for material that later became the bestselling book A Pattern Language.

The book prescribed that "feeling" should be the primary criterion used for making changes to any place. Improvements to the campus should be made first to those places that needed the most help. Patterns, or good solutions to generic problems, should be available in a community encyclopedia. Care should be taken to curb the economic and political power of large monolithic projects. Places should be shaped for people, to make them feel more whole, and to nourish them; and people should be involved in the construction of their community.

== Today ==
Most new campus buildings at the University of Oregon reflect the influence of participation by user groups. Documentation related to the building of the University of Oregon science complex in the late 1980s describes 'pattern language' planning principles in process.

However, another variety of campus buildings reflects only the vision of its donor. The Hatfield-Dowlin Complex, for example, stirred controversy when it was learnt that the University of Oregon had no part in planning nor managing construction. The building was constructed on university property and presented as a gift, by a co-founder of Nike. Jeff Hawkins, Senior Associate Athletic Director of Football Administration and Operations at the university, was quoted as saying, "We are the University of Nike." Hawkins later clarified his comment, stating that he was speaking metaphorically about the shared ideals and passions between the University of Oregon and Nike. Participation of user groups was not mentioned.
