= Michael Mehaffy =

American architect

Michael West Mehaffy (born October 24, 1955, in Beaumont, Texas) is an urbanist, architectural theorist, urban philosopher, researcher, educator, and executive director of Sustasis Foundation, based in Portland, Oregon, USA.

Mehaffy has held teaching and/or research appointments in architecture, urban planning and philosophy at eight graduate institutions in seven countries. He is currently Faculty Associate at Arizona State University. He is the former Director of Education of The Prince's Foundation for the Built Environment in London, UK, and advisor to the former Prince of Wales (now King Charles III).

== Books ==
Mehaffy is the author of Cities Alive: Jane Jacobs, Christopher Alexander and the Roots of the New Urban Renaissance. The book explores the ideas behind the United Nations’ “New Urban Agenda” to which Mehaffy contributed as a consultant to UN-Habitat. He is also coauthor, with Nikos Salingaros, of the 2014 book Design for a Living Planet, a critique of conventional architectural practice and, as they argue, its wider context of a failing technology. He is also the lead author of A New Pattern Language: Places, Networks, Processes, a followup to the 1977 book A Pattern Language: Towns Buildings, Construction, by Christopher Alexander and associates. The new book is described as “a new collection of 80 patterns (that) emerged in part from a five-year collaboration with UN-Habitat to address new urban challenges, including rapid urbanization, slum upgrading, sustainable urbanism, (and) emerging technologies...”

Mehaffy is the editor of A City is Not a Tree, the 2015 book version of architect Christopher Alexander's 1965 essay by that title, including new commentaries by Mehaffy and other prominent colleagues in urban planning, architecture and other fields.

He is the author of Urban Form and Greenhouse Gas Emissions: Findings, Strategies, and Design Decision Support Technologies, his Ph.D. dissertation, published as a book by Delft University of Technology. Mehaffy is a contributing author to over twenty books, including The Oxford Conference: A Re-Evaluation of Education in Architecture, and New Urbanism and Beyond: Designing Cities for the Future.

== Ideas ==
Mehaffy is noted for his published research and professional articles on the works of Christopher Alexander, Jane Jacobs, urban morphology, urban self-organization, architecture, computer science, and philosophy. Together with Ward Cunningham, the inventor of wiki, he wrote a paper arguing for the importance of wiki as a "curated" process of acquiring and improving knowledge, while explaining its relationship to pattern language methodology. He has also worked extensively with Christopher Alexander and Nikos Salingaros to jointly develop new concepts of "generative codes" and urban self-organization. In the book Design for a Living Planet, Mehaffy introduced "Place Network Theory," which he described as a "grand unified theory of urbanism" synthesizing the ideas of Christopher Alexander, Jane Jacobs, Kevin Lynch, Alfred North Whitehead, René Thom, Bruno Latour and others.

In philosophy, Mehaffy has argued for a "neo-structuralism" to inform architecture and urbanism, and to resolve key problems in philosophy and linguistics. Mehaffy argued that the abstractions of language should be regarded as physical structures in the world, no different in nature from the structures they represent, but that they are distinctive only in the symmetric relationships that humans exploit to map experience and to guide action. He has referred to this theory as “Symmetric Structuralism”.

== Practice, teaching and research ==
Mehaffy is a practicing urban planner and designer, with a key role in a number of noted projects including Orenco Station, a walkable mixed-use transit-oriented development on the Portland, Oregon light rail line. He has also been active in developing a number of urban design innovations including "sprawl retrofit," to help reconfigure sprawling, fragmented suburban developments into complete, walkable neighborhoods, and "generative codes," design codes that promote greater self-organization and adaptive form.

Mehaffy has held periodic appointments in teaching or research at the University of Oregon, Arizona State University, the University of Strathclyde in Glasgow, UK, the University of Trento in Trento, Italy, and Tecnologico de Monterrey in Querétaro, Mexico. As Director of Education at The Prince's Foundation for Building Community, he developed an education curriculum that formed the basis of a new Masters of Science in Sustainable Urban Development at the University of Oxford. He was the Academic Chair of the Future of Places, a partnership of UN-Habitat, the Project for Public Space, and the Ax:son Johnson Foundation, and a lead-in conference series to the 2016 United Nations Habitat III conference. He was also Project Manager for the European School of Architecture and Urbanism, an EU-funded pilot curriculum with five university partners.

Mehaffy is a Fellow of the Congress for the New Urbanism, a Senior Fellow of the Center for Local Governance, and a member of the INTBAU College of Traditional Practitioners.

== Education ==
Mehaffy studied music composition and the arts at California Institute of the Arts for his first two years of college study, before transferring to Evergreen State College where he received his Bachelor of Arts in liberal arts, science and architecture in 1978. He studied philosophy of science at the Graduate School of the University of Texas at Austin, and architecture and urban planning at The University of California, Berkeley, before earning his PhD in architecture at Delft University of Technology. As a member of the Faculty of Architecture at Delft, he worked on urban form and climate change, pattern languages, and new wiki technologies in design.

== Personal life ==
Mehaffy was the youngest of six children. He has three daughters with his former wife Pamela Mehaffy, and seven grandchildren.
