= Albany Hill =

San Francisco Bay hill

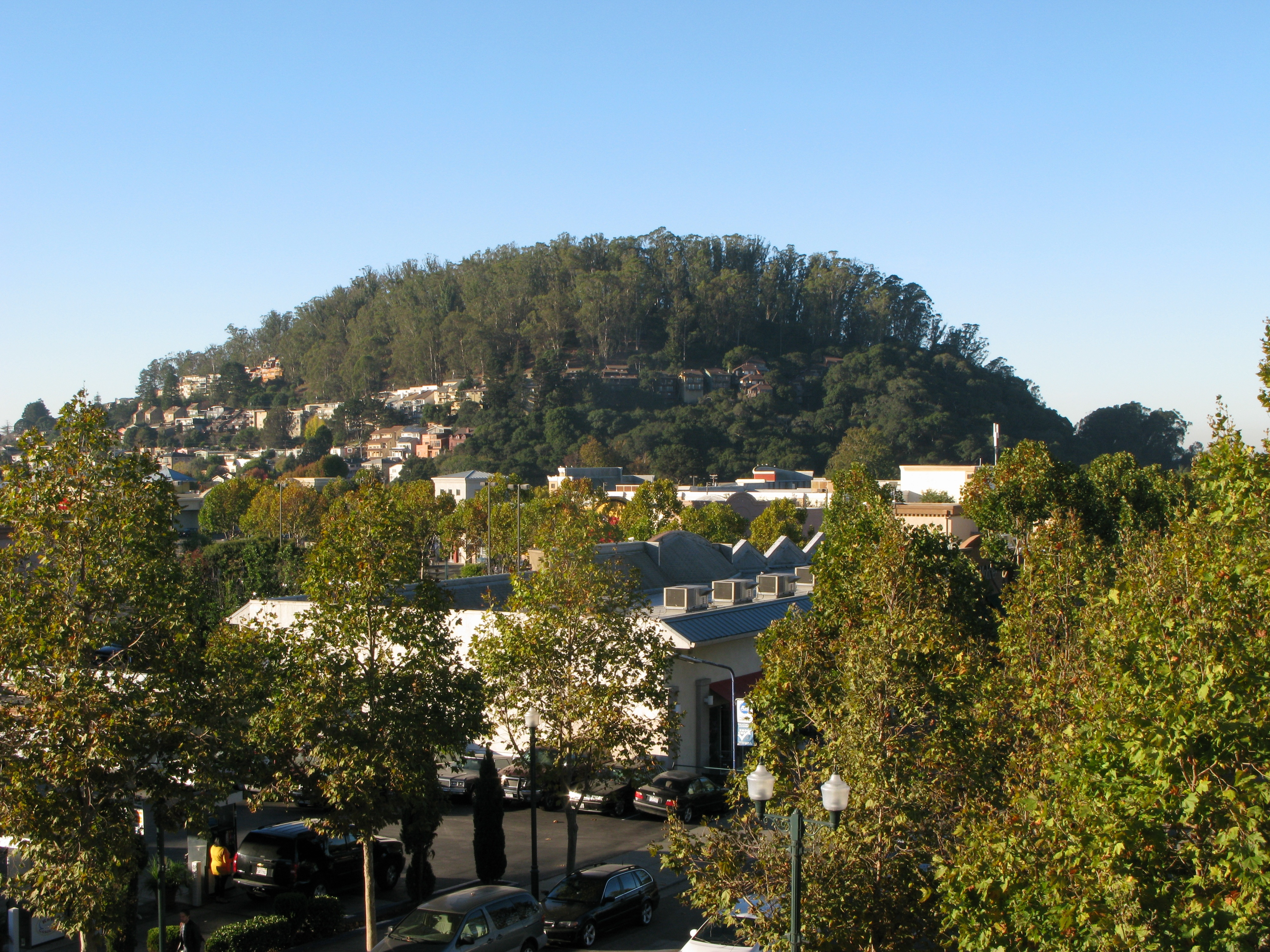
- Albany Hill from El Cerrito Plaza BART station

Highest point
- Elevation: 338 ft (103 m) NGVD 29
- Coordinates: 37°53′42″N 122°18′17″W

Geography
- Location within California Location within the United States
- Location: Alameda County, California, U.S.
- Topo map: USGS Richmond

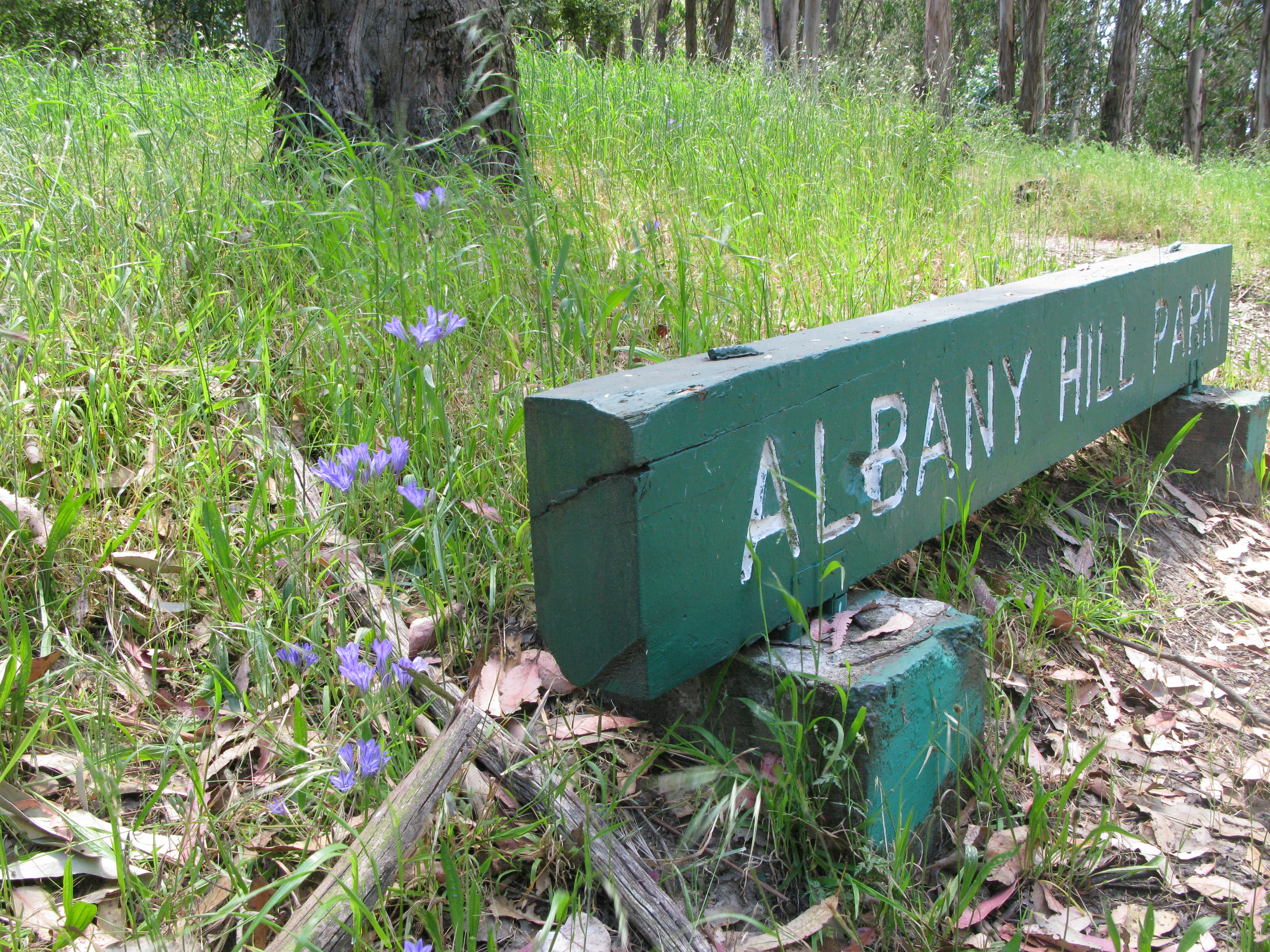
Entrance to Albany Hill Park, north end of Taft Ave

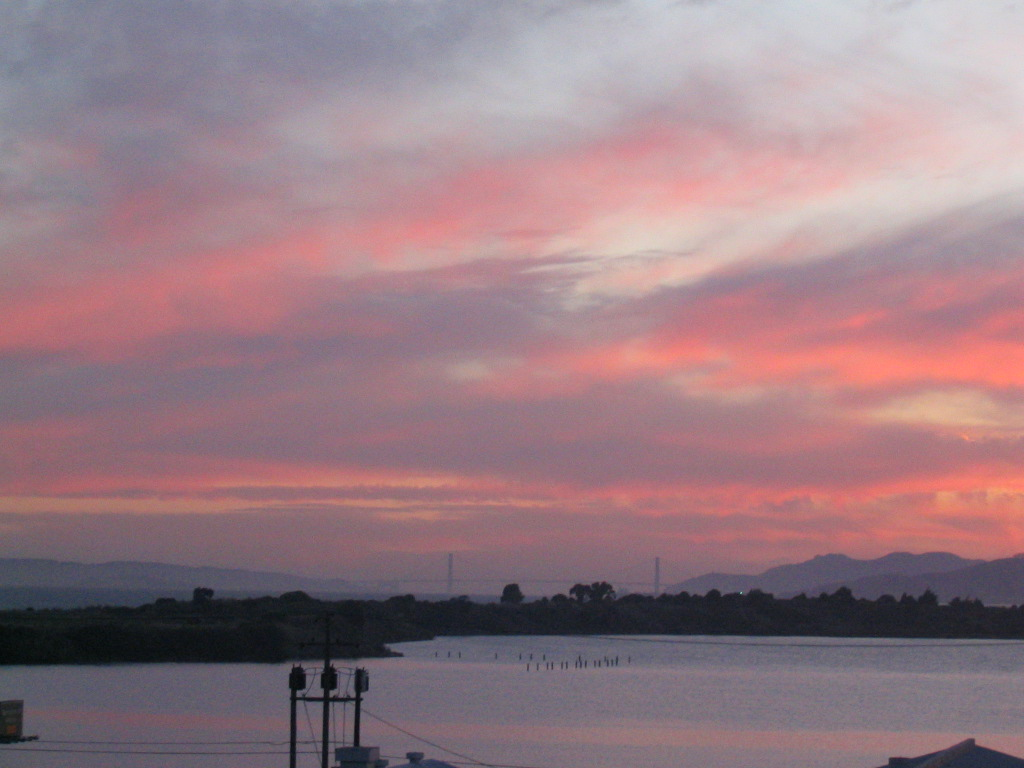
View of Golden Gate Bridge and the San Francisco Bay, from the western side of Albany Hill.

Albany Hill is a prominent hill along the east shore of San Francisco Bay in the city of Albany, California. Geologically, the hill is predominantly Jurassic sandstone, carried to the western edge of North America on the Pacific Plate and scraped off there in the course of subduction. Albany Hill is part of a range of hills uplifted long before today's Berkeley Hills. These hills include Fleming Point and Point Isabel (their summits dynamited away), Brooks Island, the Potrero San Pablo, and the hills across San Pablo Strait.

Albany Hill's indigenous Ohlone name is unknown. The 1772 Fages expedition referred to the landmark as "El Cerrito," and it was named Cerrito de San Antonio by the Luís María Peralta family after the name of their ranch, Rancho San Antonio, a Spanish land grant which encompassed much of the East Bay. The name was changed to Albany Hill shortly after the city incorporated as Ocean View changed its name to Albany in 1909. The adjacent city of El Cerrito was named after the hill's original Spanish name.

== Early history ==
The north side of Albany Hill was long used by Chochenyo Ohlone, as evidenced by large mortar stones and remnants of a shell midden. Oaks on the north side, the willow grove where tributary Middle Creek joins Cerrito Creek, salt and fresh wetlands to the north (now filled), and the nearby Bay would have made this a bountiful seasonal home.

Beginning in the late 19th century, after repeated accidental explosions manufacturing dynamite, Giant Powder Company moved next to Albany Hill from San Francisco, with Judson and Sheppard Chemical Works moving into Albany Hill’s northwest foot to supply Giant acid for production. Around this time the eucalyptus trees now on the hill were planted by these aforementioned dynamite manufacturers to catch debris and muffle the sounds of potential explosions, of which there were several. The stop on the transcontinental railroad tracks just to the west was called Nobel Station after Alfred Nobel, the inventor of dynamite and founder of the Nobel Peace Prize.

In 1905, a massive accidental explosion took place, ending the manufacturing of explosives on Albany Hill as production moved to more remote locations. Quarrying on the hill continued for many years, leaving scars on the rock and eventually obliterating a low summit northwest of Albany Hill, approximately where Richmond's Pacific East Mall is now located.

== Ecology ==
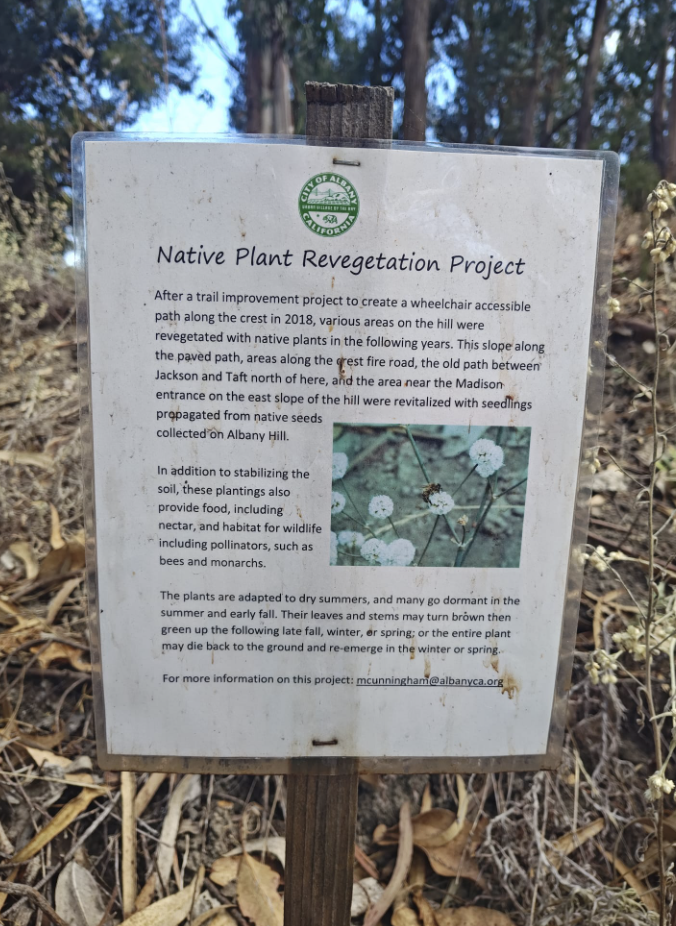
A placard seen on Albany Hill detailing a Native Plant Revegetation Project happening.

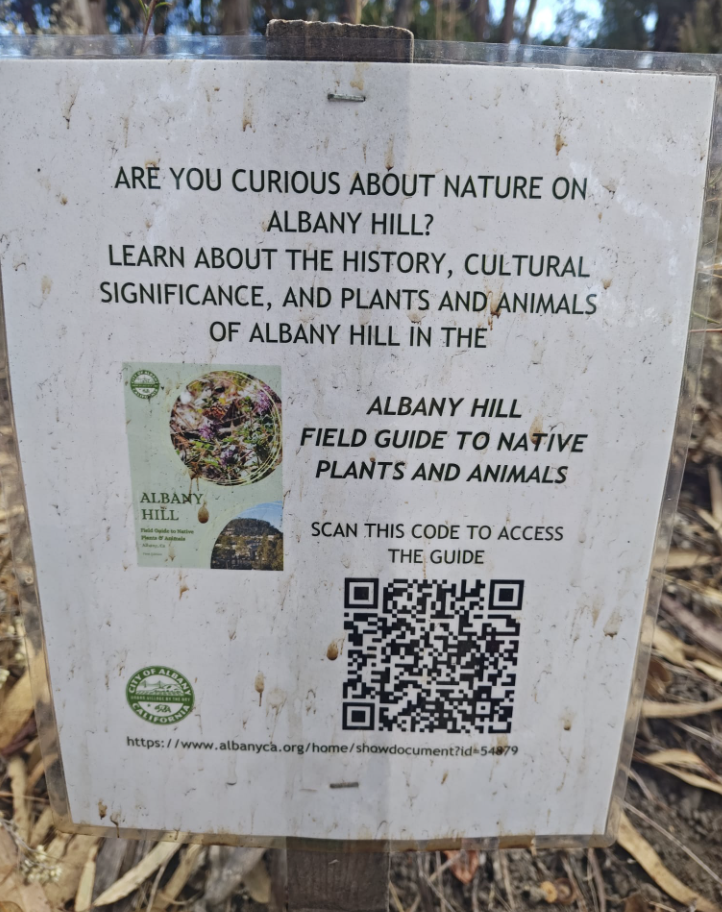
A placard seen on Albany Hill with information about the Albany Hill Field Guide.

As a large open space, the only nearby high elevation next to the Bay, and in the path of sea winds blowing through the Golden Gate, Albany Hill is an ecological island. It is a haven for plants normally found in much cooler areas, for example Nootka rose (Rosa nutkana), stinging phacelia (Phacelia malvifolia), and coast horkelia (Horkelia californica ssp. californica). The Native American practice of regular burning to avoid brush buildup (and major fires) was continued by the dynamite companies and later the city, into the 1960s. Perhaps as a result, the hill harbors unusually large numbers of native wildflowers and other plants. The oak forest on the cool north face remains much as it was pre-European-settlement. The non-native eucalyptus trees on the summit attract migrating and wintering monarch butterflies. Hawks, Great Horned owls, wild turkeys, Anna’s Hummingbird, Townsend’s warbler, striped skunks, black-tailed deer, and the western forest scorpion are among the animal inhabitants; mallard ducks, black-crowned night herons, kingfishers, and egrets fish the creek. Coyotes are also occasionally seen in the area.

In 2023, Isobel Readdie created the first edition of the Albany Hill Field Guide which provides a comprehensive overview of the history and ecology of Albany Hill. Among the flora found on the Hill, this Guide notes:

Grasses: Blue Wild Rye (Elymus glaucus), Foothill Needle Grass (Stipa lepida), and Purple Needle Grass (Stipa pulchra)

Trees and Shrubs: California Hazelnut (Corylus cornuta spp. californica), Coast Live Oak (Quercus agrifolia), Poison Oak (Toxicodendron diversilobum)

Herbaceous Plants: California Goldenrod (Solidago velutina ssp. californica), California Mugwort (Artemisia douglasiana), Coyote Mint (Monardella villosa), Hairy Gumplant (Grindelia hirsutula var. hirsutula), Indian Lettuce or Rooreh (Claytonia perfoliata), Sticky Monkey Flower (Diplacus aurantiacus), Wavy-Leaved Soap Plant (Chlorogalum pomeridianum)

In addition, Margot Cunningham’s Natural History of Albany Hill identified:

Lichens: Flavoparmelia caperata, buckeye branch, Xanthoria parietina

Fungi: false turkey tail, lion’s mane, butter and eggs, western hardwood sulphur shelf

Butterflies: western monarchs, common checkered skipper, anise swallowtail

Other insects: green sweat bee, vinegar ant or velvety tree ant, dancer (type of damsel fly)

Herps: slender salamander, arboreal salamander, California alligator lizard, ring-necked snake

== Modern history ==
The hill provides an unobstructed view of Albany, Berkeley — notably, UC Berkeley's Sather Tower — and the Berkeley Hills. Turning away from the hills, one can look out onto the Bay, with San Francisco in the distance. Looking south, the high-rises in downtown Oakland and Emeryville are visible. From the earliest European settlement, residents have enjoyed open space on the hill, "sledding" on dry grass and swinging from rope swings.

From the early 20th century on, particularly in the 1970s, numerous schemes were proposed for development of Albany Hill, from dynamiting it for bay fill to building high-rise hotels or blasting out the top to create a reservoir. Protest by local residents defeated most of these. Eventually the city retained an environmental consultant to prepare an Environmental Impact Report on alternative development schemes and development densities. After a series of public hearings the consultant's recommendation design was chosen leading to the present development pattern of clustered high-rise residential use and preservation of the majority of the hill.

In 1994, citizens passed Measure K, cutting allowed density on the hill by half and allowing the city to pursue further lowering, and in 1996 voters passed Measure R, a special levy including $3 million to buy land on the hill. In 2008, the remaining open space hill was declared a Priority Conservation Area by Bay Area and state agencies. By 2019, when the bonds matured, the city had bought small parcels totaling six acres. The remaining bond funds in 2019 were being spent for access and other improvements called for in the city's plans for the park, adopted first in 1991 and repeated in a new plan adopted in 2012.

Just under 3/4 of the almost 40 acres of open space on the hill is protected from development. A public park extends from Cerrito Creek up the north side of the hill. Large condominiums on the west side of the hill maintain significant areas of open space as part of their development agreements, and the north part of the summit ridge and a portion of the northeast slope is owned by the city.

The remaining quarter of the open space is a single tract: South of the highest point, a 10.7-acre privately owned parcel runs from Pierce Street on the west up over the summit and down to Taft Street on the east slope. Most users treat this land as park, but the city has never negotiated a legal right-of-way allowing public access. In late 2019, this tract was listed for sale at $10 million. It is zoned for apartments or town homes, with a maximum density of nine units per acre. The city's Master Plan includes various policies regarding this parcel, including keeping the summit open, clustering development, providing a trail easement, protecting monarch butterfly habitat, minimizing grading, and protecting and restoring the hill's natural features, native vegetation, and wildlife.

== Albany Hill Fire ==
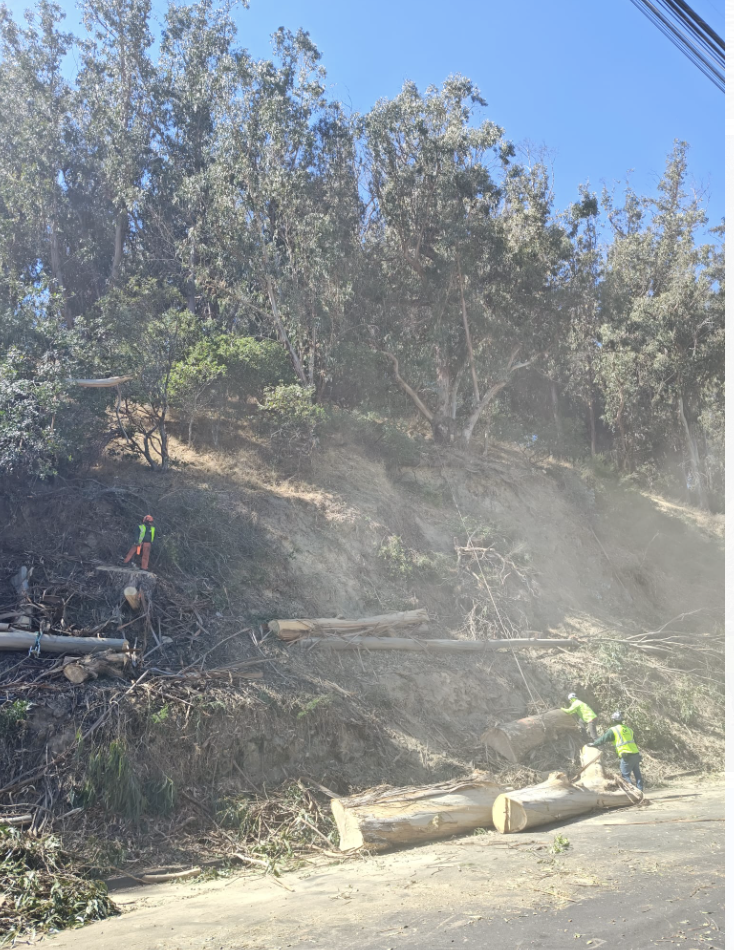
Eucalyptus trees being removed from Albany Hill.

Fire is a serious concern on this wooded hill surrounded by city. Plans adopted in 1991 and 2012 call for thinning eucalyptus and controlling brush to create a savannah-like habitat that would limit fires. On November 15, 2008, strong dry northeast winds whipped up a fire in a forested area on the west side of the hill above a large apartment complex (555 Pierce Street). Luckily, heavy rains and a prompt response by the Albany and Berkeley fire departments limited the blaze to 2 acres (8,100 m^{2}), with no structures burned.

More recently, on June 26, 2022, a vegetation fire broke out on the west side on Albany Hill, burning near Cleveland and Washington avenues. The City of Albany asked residents of Gateview, Hillside, and Taft St. to evacuate. An initial evacuation center was set at Golden Gate Fields but luckily, the fire was quickly contained and nobody was injured. As a result of many fires in years’ past, the city has increased brush control, road maintenance, and clearing. Clearing is limited by wanting to maintain habitat for birds, including several species of hawks, owls and woodpeckers, and monarch butterflies that use the eucalyptus trees as a migration stopover or winter habitat.

Despite these concerns over potential habitat loss, in October 2021 the Albany City Council established a Capital Improvement Project, called The Albany Hill Eucalyptus Project (CIP No. 41015), in an effort to address the health of the eucalyptus trees as well as to mitigate fire risk on the Hill. In September 2022, the City of Albany was awarded a $230,000 California State Coastal Conservancy grant to help support the goals of the Albany Hill Eucalyptus Project. In addition, the City of Albany released an Albany Hill Forest Management and Habitat Restoration Plan which outlines a multi-year project focused on removal of eucalyptus trees, with plans for restoration of native grasslands and oaks in their place. In September 2024, several large eucalyptus trees overhanging Jackson Street were removed by the city after being deemed a safety risk.

Currently, the City's Public Works and Fire Departments monitor safety on the Hill. In 2021, the Richmond-based nonprofit Urban Tilth was awarded a contract to maintain the creeks and open space. In addition, several volunteer groups work on and near the hill. Friends of Albany Hill has worked to maintain and increase native vegetation on the hill itself by removing non-native invasive plants. The Friends have also educated the public about the natural and cultural significance of the hill, monitor the wintering site for the monarch butterfly migration and trail improvement projects, and in the 1990s they helped bring privately held parcels into city hands. Friends of Albany Hill Friends of Five Creeks has done extensive restoration along Cerrito and Middle Creeks and adjoining groves and meadows at the foot of the hill. A new group,TASH (Tending the Ancient Shoreline Hill), formed in 2018 to continue habitat restoration and environmental education on Albany Hill, holds monthly work parties.

== Lions Club cross ==
A 20-foot cross was erected near the summit of Albany Hill. This was done by the Albany Lions Club in 1971 on then-private land, subject to an easement allowing for maintenance by the Lions Club. The land was obtained by the City of Albany in 1973. The cross was illuminated by the Lions Club on Christmas, Easter, and other occasions such as the anniversary of the September 11 attacks.

The cross has been subject to disputes regarding the Lions Club easement and the legality of a Christian symbol displayed on public land. In 2016, the city cut off power to the cross for several months, citing safety concerns regarding the electrical wiring. In June 2018, a federal judge ruled the display unconstitutional, requiring that the city remove the cross or sell the parcel on which it stands. The cross was removed by the city on June 8, 2023 in accordance with a court order. The appeal filed by the Lions Club was denied. A motion filed with the federal court was also denied. A final settlement came in October 2024 whereby the city agreed to pay the Lions Club $1.53 million for the easement.

== Proposed Development of the West Side of the Hill ==
In January 2020, a development of 96 residences on private property zoned for residential use on the west side of Albany Hill, facing the Golden Gate, was proposed by Trumark Homes.

== See also ==
- Sala House
