= A City Is Not a Tree =

1965 essay by Christopher Alexander

- Author: Christopher Alexander
- Series: Center for Environmental Structure
- Subject: Architecture
- Publisher: Sustasis Foundation
- Publication date: 2015
- Pages: 241
- ISBN: 978-0-98-934697-9
- Preceded by: The Battle for the Life and Beauty of the Earth

A City Is Not a Tree is a widely cited 1965 essay by architect and design theorist Christopher Alexander. It was first published in Architectural Forum and has been re-published many times since. In 2015, the essay was published as a book that included new commentaries by architects, engineers and physicists. A City is Not a Tree has been widely described as a landmark text, and the Resource for Urban Design Information calls it "one of the classic references in the literature of the built environment and related fields". In 2016 a 50th Anniversary edition was published by Sustasis Press/Off the Common Books.

Its core contention is that urban planners tend to design cities as tree diagrams (with each node only having a relationship with a parent node), while successful unplanned cities have a semi-lattice structure (where each node has relationships with many nodes).
