= Architectural designer =

The term architectural designer may refer to a building designer who is not a registered architect, architectural technologist or any other person that is involved in the design process of buildings or urban landscapes.

Architectural designers may not hold the same degree qualification and are generally not recognised by a statutory body. Depending on the jurisdiction, limitations may exist in project size and scope that an architectural designer is permitted to perform services for without direct supervision from a registered architect. Independent architectural designers generally work on projects that are within these limitations.

Often, building designers who have not registered as architects are referred to as architectural designers, as this term is not protected by statute in many countries. However, in many countries around the world, the term architectural designer and the derivatives of architecture are legally reserved for registered architects.

== See also ==
- Building design
- Landscape architecture
- List of BIM software
- Open-source architecture
- Urban design
