= Christopher Alexander =

British-American architect (1936–2022)

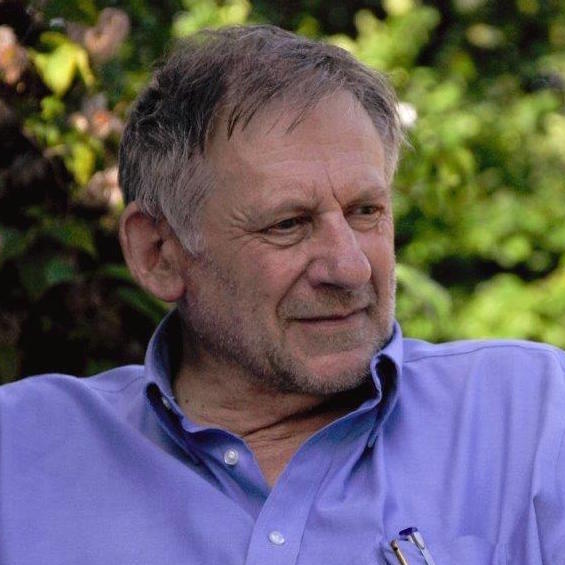
- Alexander in 2012
- Born: Christopher Wolfgang Alexander; 4 October 1936; Vienna, Austria
- Died: 17 March 2022 (aged 85); Binsted, England, UK
- Education: Trinity College, Cambridge (BA); Harvard University (PhD)
- Occupation: Architect
- Awards: Vincent Scully Prize; Global Award for Sustainable Architecture
- Projects: Pattern languages

Christopher Wolfgang John Alexander (4 October 1936 – 17 March 2022) was an Austrian-born British-American architect and design theorist. He was a professor at the University of California, Berkeley. His theories about the nature of human-centered design have affected fields beyond architecture, including urban design, software design, and sociology. Alexander designed and personally built more than 200 buildings, both as an architect and a general contractor.

In software, Alexander is regarded as the father of the pattern language movement. According to creator Ward Cunningham, the first wiki—the technology behind Wikipedia—was inspired directly by Alexander's ideas. Alexander's work also informed the creation of the agile software development movement.

== Education ==
Alexander attended the Dragon School in Oxford and then Oundle School. In 1954, he was awarded the top open scholarship to Trinity College, Cambridge, in chemistry and physics, and went on to read mathematics. He earned a Bachelor's degree in Architecture and a master's degree in mathematics. He took his doctorate at Harvard (the first PhD in Architecture ever awarded at Harvard University). His dissertation "The Synthesis of Form: Some Notes on a Theory" was completed in 1962. He was elected fellow at Harvard. During the same period he worked at MIT in transportation theory and computer science, and worked at Harvard in cognition and cognitive studies.

== Career ==
In architecture, Alexander's work is used by a number of different contemporary architectural communities of practice, including the New Urbanist movement, to help people to reclaim control over their own built environment. However, Alexander was controversial among some mainstream architects and critics, in part because his work was often harshly critical of much of contemporary architectural theory and practice.

Alexander is best known for his 1977 book A Pattern Language, a perennial seller some four decades after publication. Reasoning that users are more sensitive to their needs than any architect could be, he collaborated with his students Sara Ishikawa, Murray Silverstein, Max Jacobson, Ingrid King, and Shlomo Angel to produce a pattern language that would empower anyone to design and build at any scale.

His other books include Notes on the Synthesis of Form, A City is Not a Tree (first published as a paper and re-published in book form in 2015), The Timeless Way of Building, A New Theory of Urban Design, The Oregon Experiment, the four-volume The Nature of Order: An Essay on the Art of Building and the Nature of the Universe, about his theories of "morphogenetic" processes, and The Battle for the Life and Beauty of the Earth, about the implementation of his theories in a large building project in Japan.

== Personal life ==
Alexander was born in Vienna, Austria to his Catholic father, Ferdinand Johann Alfred Alexander, and Jewish mother, Lilly Edith Elizabeth (née Deutsch) Alexander. As a young child, Alexander emigrated in fall 1938 with his parents from Austria to England, when his parents were forced to flee the Nazi regime. In England, his parents worked as German language teachers. Alexander spent much of his childhood in Chichester and Oxford, England, where he began his education in the sciences. He moved from England to the United States in 1958 to study at Harvard University and Massachusetts Institute of Technology. He moved to Berkeley, California in 1963 to accept an appointment as Professor of Architecture, a position he would hold for almost 40 years. In 2002, after his retirement, Alexander moved to Arundel, England, where he continued to write, teach and build up to the time of his illness and death. Alexander was married to Margaret Moore Alexander, and he had two daughters, Sophie and Lily, by his former wife Pamela Patrick. Alexander held both British and American citizenship.

On 17 March 2022, Alexander died of pneumonia in his home in Binsted, England.

== Honours ==
Alexander was elected to the Society of Fellows, Harvard University 1961–64; awarded the First Medal for Research by the American Institute of Architects, 1972; (FAIA) elected member of the Swedish Royal Academy of Arts, 1980; winner of the Best Building in Japan award, 1985; winner of the ACSA (Association of Collegiate Schools of Architecture) Distinguished Professor Award, 1986 and 1987; invited to present the Louis Kahn Memorial Lecture, 1992; elected a Fellow of the American Academy of Arts and Sciences, 1996; one of the two inaugural recipients of the Athena Medal, given by the Congress for the New Urbanism (CNU), 2006;. awarded (in absentia) the Vincent Scully Prize by the National Building Museum, 2009; awarded the lifetime achievement award by the Urban Design Group, 2011; winner of the Global Award for Sustainable Architecture, 2014 and 1994 Seaside Prize recipient.

== Career ==
=== Author ===
The Timeless Way of Building (1979) described the perfection of use to which buildings could aspire:

There is one timeless way of building. It is a thousand years old, and the same today as it has ever been. The great traditional buildings of the past, the villages and tents and temples in which man feels at home, have always been made by people who were very close to the center of this way. It is not possible to make great buildings, or great towns, beautiful places, places where you feel yourself, places where you feel alive, except by following this way. And, as you will see, this way will lead anyone who looks for it to buildings which are themselves as ancient in their form, as the trees and hills, and as our faces are.

A Pattern Language: Towns, Buildings, Construction (1977), co-authored with Sara Ishikawa and Murray Silverstein, described a practical architectural system in a form that a theoretical mathematician or computer scientist might call a generative grammar. The work originated from an observation that many medieval cities are attractive and harmonious. The authors said that this occurs because they were built to local regulations that required specific features, but freed the architect to adapt them to particular situations. The book had its beginnings with an early version of Alexander's PhD dissertation based on fieldwork in the Bavra village in Gujarat, India.

The book provides rules and pictures, and leaves decisions to be taken from the precise environment of the project. It describes exact methods for constructing practical, safe, and attractive designs at every scale, from entire regions, through cities, neighborhoods, gardens, buildings, rooms, built-in furniture, and fixtures down to the level of doorknobs. A notable value is that the architectural system consists only of classic patterns tested in the real world and reviewed by multiple architects for beauty and practicality.

The book includes all needed surveying and structural calculations, and a novel simplified building system that copes with regional shortages of wood and steel, uses easily stored inexpensive materials, and produces long-lasting classic buildings with small amounts of materials, design and labor. It first has users prototype a structure on-site in temporary materials. Once accepted, these are finished by filling them with very-low-density concrete. It uses vaulted construction to build as high as three stories, permitting very high densities.

This book's method was adopted by the University of Oregon as described in The Oregon Experiment (1975), and remains the official planning instrument. It has also been adopted in part by some cities as a building code.

The idea of a pattern language appears to apply to any complex engineering task, and has been applied to some of them. It has been especially influential in software engineering where patterns have been used to document collective knowledge in the field.

A New Theory of Urban Design (1987) coincided with a renewal of interest in urbanism among architects, but stood apart from most other expressions of this by assuming a distinctly anti-masterplanning stance. An account of a design studio conducted with University of California Berkeley students on a site in San Francisco, it shows how convincing urban networks can be generated by requiring individual actors to respect only local rules, in relation to neighbours. A vastly undervalued part of the Alexander canon, A New Theory is important in understanding the generative processes which give rise to the shanty towns latterly championed by Stewart Brand, Robert Neuwirth, and Charles III, the then Prince of Wales (2001). There have been critical reconstructions of Alexander's design studio based on the theories put forward in A New Theory of Urban Design.

The Nature of Order: An Essay on the Art of Building and the Nature of the Universe (2003–04), which includes The Phenomenon of Life, The Process of Creating Life, A Vision of a Living World and The Luminous Ground, is Alexander's most comprehensive and elaborate work. In it, he put forth a new theory about the nature of space and described how this theory influences thinking about architecture, building, planning, and the way in which we view the world in general. The mostly static patterns from A Pattern Language were amended by more dynamic sequences, which describe how to work towards patterns (which can roughly be seen as the result of sequences). Sequences, like patterns, promise to be tools of wider scope than building (just as his theory of space goes beyond architecture).

The online publication Katarxis 3 (September 2004) includes several essays by Christopher Alexander, as well as a debate between Alexander and Peter Eisenman from 1982.

Alexander's final book published while he was alive, The Battle for the Life and Beauty of the Earth: A Struggle Between Two World-Systems (2012), is the story of the largest project he and his colleagues had ever tackled, the construction of a new High School/College campus in Japan. He also used the project to connect with themes in his four-volume series. He contrasted his approach, (System A) with the construction processes endemic in the U.S. and Japanese economies (System B). As Alexander describes it, System A is focused on enhancing the life/spirit of spaces within given constraints (land, budget, client needs, etc.) (drawings are sketches – decisions on placing buildings, materials used, finish and such are made in the field as construction proceeds, with adjustments as needed to meet overall budget); System B ignores, and tends to diminish or destroy that quality because there is an inherent flaw: System A is a generally a product of a different Economic System than we live in now. When the architect is only responsible for concept and casual field drawings (which the builder uses to build structures at the lowest possible [competitive] cost), the builder finds that System A can not produce acceptable results at the lowest market cost. Except for a culture where land and material costs are low or first world clients who are sensitive, patient and wealthy. In most cases, the economically motivated builder must use a hybrid system. In the best case, System AB, the builder uses the processes of System A to differentiate, improve and inform his work. Or there are no economic considerations and the builder is the architect and is building for himself. In the last few chapters he described "centers" as a way of thinking about the connections among spaces, and about what brings more wholeness and life to a space.

=== Works of architecture ===
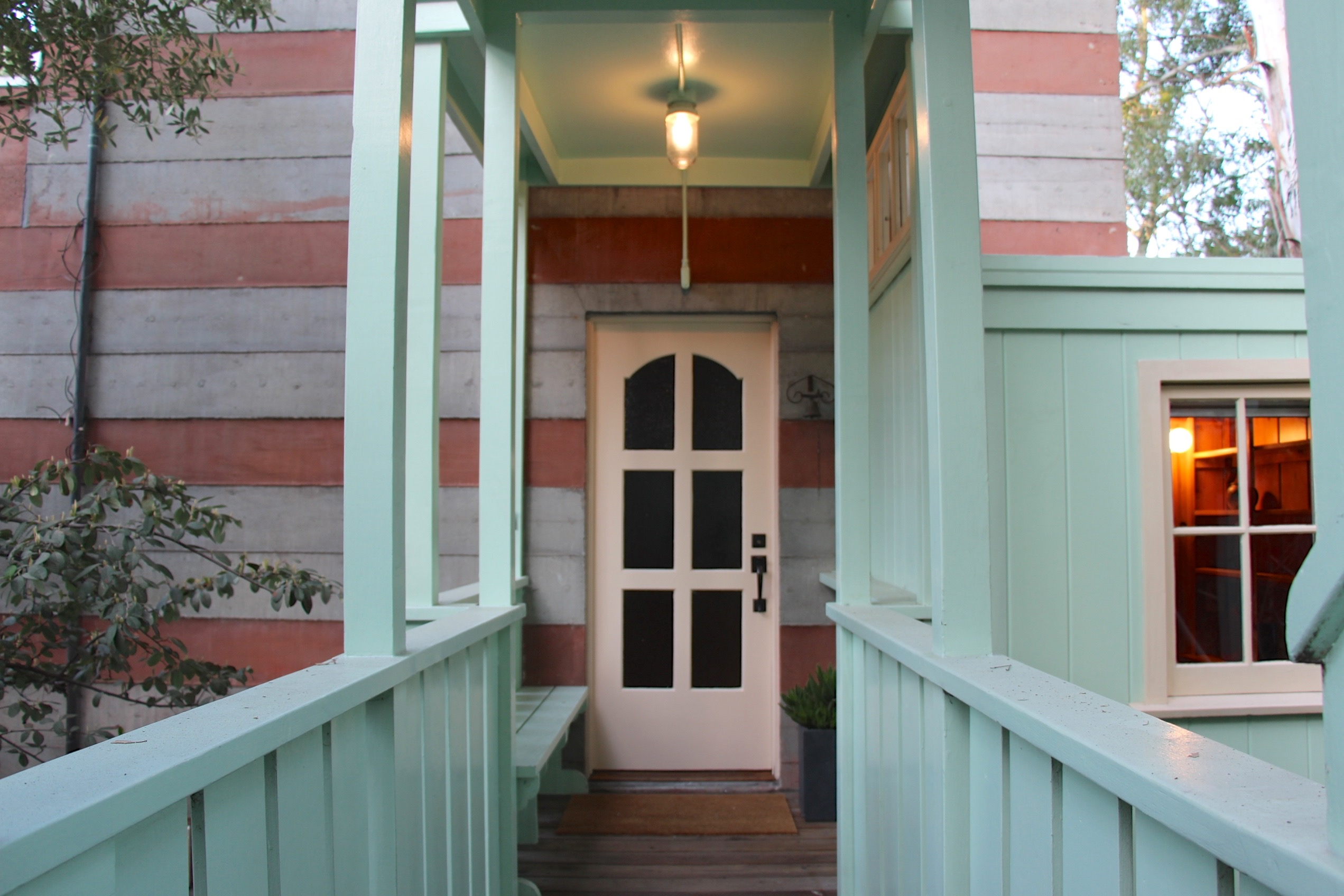
Entrance to the Sala House

Among Alexander's most notable built works are the Eishin Campus near Tokyo (the building process of which is outlined in his 2012 book The Battle for the Life and Beauty of the Earth); the West Dean Visitors Centre in West Sussex, England; the Julian Street Inn (a homeless shelter) in San Jose, California (both described in Nature of Order); the Sala House and the Martinez House (experimental houses in Albany and Martinez, California made of lightweight concrete); the low-cost housing in Mexicali, Mexico (described in The Production of Houses); and several private houses (described and illustrated in The Nature of Order). Alexander's built work is characterized by a special quality (which he used to call "the quality without a name", but named "wholeness" in Nature of Order) that relates to human beings and induces feelings of belonging to the place and structure. This quality is found in the most loved traditional and historic buildings and urban spaces, and is precisely what Alexander has tried to capture with his sophisticated mathematical design theories. Paradoxically, achieving this connective human quality has also moved his buildings away from the abstract imageability valued in contemporary architecture, and this is one reason why his buildings are under-appreciated at present.

His former student and colleague Michael Mehaffy wrote an introductory essay on Alexander's built work in the online publication Katarxis 3, which includes a gallery of Alexander's major built projects through September 2004.

=== Teaching ===
In addition to his lengthy teaching career as a professor at UC Berkeley (during which a number of international students began to appreciate and apply his methods), Alexander was a key faculty member at both The Prince of Wales's Summer Schools in Civil Architecture (1990–1994) and The Prince's Foundation for the Built Environment. He also initiated the process which led to the international Building Beauty post-graduate school for architecture, which launched in Sorrento, Italy for the 2017–18 academic year.

== Influence ==
Alexander has been influential both in architecture and in a wide variety of other areas of study.

=== Architecture ===
Alexander's work has widely influenced architects; among those who acknowledge his influence are Sarah Susanka, Andres Duany, and Witold Rybczynski. Robert Campbell, the Pulitzer Prize-winning architecture critic for the Boston Globe, stated that Alexander "has had an enormous critical influence on my life and work, and I think that's true of a whole generation of people."

Architecture critic Peter Buchanan, in an essay for The Architectural Review's 2012 campaign The Big Rethink, argues that Alexander's work as reflected in A Pattern Language is "thoroughly subversive and forward looking rather than regressive, as so many misunderstand it to be." He continues:

Even architects not immune to the charms of the places depicted, are loath to pursue the folksy aesthetic they see as implied and do not want to engage with such primitive construction—although the systemic collapse now unfolding may force that upon them. The daunting challenge for architects then, if such a thing is even possible to realise, would be to recreate in a more contemporary idiom both the richness and quality of experience suggested by the pattern language.

Many urban development projects continue to incorporate Alexander's ideas. Alexander is one of the biggest influencers of the Metamodernist movement in architecture, which is part of the broader Post-postmodern movement of the 21st century. In the UK the developers Living Villages have been highly influenced by Alexander's work and used A Pattern Language as the basis for the design of The Wintles in Bishops Castle, Shropshire. Sarah Susanka's "Not So Big House" movement adapts and popularizes Alexander's patterns and outlook.

=== Computer science ===
Alexander's Notes on the Synthesis of Form has been cited by researchers in computer science since the late 1960s. It had an influence in the 1960s and 1970s on programming language design, modular programming, object-oriented programming, software engineering and other design methodologies. Alexander's mathematical concepts and orientation were similar to Edsger Dijkstra's influential A Discipline of Programming.

The greatest influence of A Pattern Language in computer science is the design patterns movement. Alexander's philosophy of incremental, organic, coherent design also influenced the extreme programming movement. The Wiki was invented to allow the Hillside Group to work collaboratively on programming design patterns. More recently the "deep geometrical structures" as discussed in The Nature of Order have been cited as having importance for object-oriented programming, particularly in C++.

Will Wright wrote that Alexander's work was influential in the origin of the SimCity computer games, and in his later game Spore.

Alexander often led his own software research, such as the 1996 Gatemaker project with Greg Bryant.

Alexander discovered and conceived a recursive structure, so called wholeness, which is defined mathematically, exists in space and matter physically, and reflects in our minds and cognition psychologically. He had his idea of wholeness back to early 1980s when he finished his first version of The Nature of Order. His idea of wholeness or degree of wholeness relying on a recursive structure of centers resemble aspects of Google's PageRank.

=== Religion ===
The fourth volume of The Nature of Order approaches religious questions from a scientific and philosophical rather than mystical direction, focusing in human feelings, well-being and nature interaction rather than metaphysics. In it, Alexander describes deep ties between the nature of matter, human perception of the universe, and the geometries people construct in buildings, cities, and artifacts. He suggests a crucial link between traditional practices and beliefs, and recent scientific advances. Despite his leanings toward Deism, and his naturalistic and anthropologic approach to religion, Alexander maintained that he was a practicing member of the Catholic Church, which he believed to have accumulated, within its knowledge, a great deal of human truth.

=== Design science ===
The life's work of Alexander is dedicated to turn design from unselfconscious behavior to selfconscious behavior, so called design science. In his very first book Notes on the Synthesis of Forms, he set what he wanted to do. He was inspired by traditional buildings, and tried to derive some 253 patterns for architectural design. Later on, he further distilled 15 geometric properties to characterize living structure in The Nature of Order. The design principles are differentiation and adaptation.

== Published works ==
Alexander's published works include:

- Community and Privacy, with Serge Chermayeff (1963)
- Notes on the Synthesis of Form (1964)
- A City is Not a Tree (1965)
- The Atoms of Environmental Structure (1967)
- A Pattern Language which Generates Multi-service Centers, with Ishikawa and Silverstein (1968)
- Houses Generated by Patterns (1969)
- The Grass Roots Housing Process (1973)
- The Center for Environmental Structure Series, made up of:
  - The Oregon Experiment (1975)
  - A Pattern Language, with Ishikawa and Silverstein (1977)
  - The Timeless Way of Building (1979)
  - The Linz Cafe (1981)
  - The Production of Houses, with Davis, Martinez, and Corner (1985)
  - A New Theory of Urban Design, with Neis, Anninou, and King (1987)
  - Foreshadowing of 21st Century Art: The Color and Geometry of Very Early Turkish Carpets (1993)
  - The Mary Rose Museum, with Black and Tsutsui (1995)
- The Nature of Order Book 1: The Phenomenon of Life (2002)
- The Nature of Order Book 2: The Process of Creating Life (2002)
- The Nature of Order Book 3: A Vision of a Living World (2005)
- The Nature of Order Book 4: The Luminous Ground (2004)
- The Battle for the Life and Beauty of the Earth: A Struggle between Two World-Systems, with Hans Joachim Neis and Maggie Moore Alexander (2012)

Unpublished:

- Sustainability and Morphogenesis (working title)

== See also ==
- Pattern gardening
