= Building design =

Planning and specifications for construction

Building design, also called architectural design, refers to the broadly based architectural, engineering and technical applications to the design of buildings. All building projects require the services of a building designer, typically a licensed architect. Smaller, less complicated projects often do not require a licensed professional, and the design of such projects is often undertaken by building designers, draftspersons, interior designers (for interior fit-outs or renovations), or contractors. Larger, more complex building projects require the services of many professionals trained in specialist disciplines, usually coordinated by an architect.

== Occupations ==
=== Architect ===
An architect is a person trained in the planning, design and supervision of the construction of buildings. Professionally, an architect's decisions affect public safety, and thus an architect must undergo specialized training consisting of advanced education and a practicum (or internship) for practical experience to earn a license to practice architecture. In most of the world's jurisdictions, the professional and commercial use of the term "architect" is legally protected.

=== Building engineer ===
Building engineering typically includes the services of electrical, mechanical and structural engineers.

=== Drafter ===
A drafter or documenter has attained a certificate or diploma in architectural drafting (or equivalent training), and provides services relating to preparing construction documents rather than building design. Some draftspersons are employed by architectural design firms and building contractors, while others are self-employed.

=== Building designer ===
In many places, building codes and legislation of professions allow persons to design single family residential buildings and, in some cases, light commercial buildings without an architectural license. As such, "Building designer" is a common designation in the United States, Canada, Australia and elsewhere for someone who offers building design services but is not a licensed architect or engineer.

Anyone may use the title of "building designer" in the broadest sense. In many places, a building designer may achieve certification demonstrating a higher level of training. In the U.S., the National Council of Building Designer Certification (NCBDC), an offshoot of the American Institute of Building Design, administers a program leading to the title of Certified Professional Building Designer (CPBD). Usually, building designers are trained as architectural technologists or draftspersons; they may also be architecture school graduates that have not completed licensing requirements.

Many building designers are known as "residential" or "home designers", since they focus mainly on residential design and remodeling. In the U.S. state of Nevada, "Residential Designer" is a regulated term for those who are registered as such under Nevada State Board of Architecture, Interior Design and Residential Design, and one may not legally represent oneself in a professional capacity without being currently registered.

In Australia where use of the term architect and some derivatives is highly restricted but the architectural design of buildings has very few restrictions in place, the term building designer is used extensively by people or design practices who are not registered by the relevant State Board of Architects. In Queensland the term building design is used in legislation which licenses practitioners as part of a broader building industry licensing system. In Victoria there is a registration process for building designers and in other States there is currently no regulation of the profession. A Building Designers Association operates in each state to represent the interests of building designers.

=== Building surveyor ===
Building surveyors are technically minded general practitioners in the United Kingdom, Australia and elsewhere, trained much like architectural technologists. In the UK, the knowledge and expertise of the building surveyor is applied to various tasks in the property and construction markets, including building design for smaller residential and light commercial projects. This aspect of the practice is similar to other European occupations, most notably the geometra in Italy, but also the géomètre in France, Belgium and Switzerland. the building surveyors are also capable on establishment of bills of quantities for the new works and renovation or maintenance or rehabilitation works.

The profession of Building Surveyor does not exist in the US. The title Surveyor refers almost exclusively to Land surveyors. Architects, Building Designers, Residential Designers, Construction Managers, and Home Inspectors perform some or all of the work of the U.K. Building Surveyor.

== See also ==
- Architectural designer
- Architectural design values - intentions which influence design decision of architects
- Facility management
- Landscape architect
- Urban design
