= Murray Silverstein =

American poet

Murray Silverstein (born September 19, 1943) co-authored the books A Pattern Language and The Oregon Experiment. At that time, he taught architecture courses at the University of California, and subsequently taught at the University of Washington. He had also written several articles on pattern languages. As a young designer, he worked for noted California architect Richard Neutra.

In 2006, a collection of his poetry entitled "Any Old Wolf" was published by Sixteen Rivers Press.

== Published works ==
Silverstein's published works include:

- Alexander, C., Silverstein, M., Angel, S., Ishikawa, S., Abrams, D. (1975). The Oregon Experiment (Center for Environmental Structure Series, Vol. 3). Oxford University Press.
- Alexander, C., Ishikawa, S., Silverstein, M. (1977). A Pattern Language: Towns, Buildings, Construction. Oxford University Press, USA.
- Jacobson, M., Silverstein, M., & Winslow, B. (2002). Patterns of home: The ten essentials of enduring design. Taunton Press.
