= The Nature of Order =

Philosophical work about architecture

- Author: Christopher Alexander
- Language: English
- Genre: Non-fiction
- Publication date: 2002-2004
- ISBN: 0-9726529-0-6

The Nature of Order: An Essay on the Art of Building and the Nature of the Universe is a four-volume work by the architect Christopher Alexander published in 2002–2004. In his earlier work, Alexander attempted to formulate the principles that lead to a good built environment as patterns, or recurring design solutions. However, he came to believe that patterns themselves are not enough to generate life in buildings and cities, and that one needs a morphogenetic understanding of the formation of the built environment as well as a deep understanding of how the makers get in touch with the creative process.

== The Phenomenon of Life ==
Volume 1 attempts to define life in the built environment and determine why one built environment may have more life than another. Important to this idea is his notion of centers:

"Centers are those particular identified sets, or systems, which appear within the larger whole as distinct and noticeable parts. They appear because they have noticeable distinctness, which makes them separate out from their surroundings and makes them cohere, and it is from the arrangements of these coherent parts that other coherent parts appear. The life or intensity of one center is increased or decreased according to the position and intensity of other nearby centers. Above all, centers become most intense when the centers which they are made of help each other."

Alexander argues that any entity (center) for example an ecosystem, landscape, garden, city, street, building, window, painting, animal or human being has a certain degree of life. According to Alexander, a human being is able to sense this degree of life in an entity objectively, as a real empirical dimension. He tries to demonstrate this to the reader with experiments that he has conducted, studies and experiments the reader can do. The ability to be aware of the degree of life of an entity, lays out the foundation for his theory and for the creative process of which human beings are, according to Alexander, capable.

The first volume contains an exposition of what the author calls the fundamental properties, which are those that are possessed by environments which have more life. He argues that processes that lead to a good built environment are those that tend to increase one or more of these properties. He identifies fifteen geometric properties which tend to accompany the presence of life in nature, and also in the buildings and cities we make. These properties are seen over and over in nature, and in cities and streets of the past, but have all but disappeared in the developments and buildings of the last one hundred years. The book shows that living structure depends on features which make a close connection with the human self, and that living structure has the capacity to support human well-being.

== The Process of Creating Life ==
Volume 2 describes the evolutionary process of creating life. Complex systems do not spring into existence fully formed, but rather through a series of small, incremental changes. The process begins with a simple system and incrementally changes that system such that each change preserves the structure of the previous step. Alexander calls these increments "structure-preserving transformations", and they are essential to his process.

Where volume 1 introduces the reader to 15 geometric properties that make up living systems, Alexander reframes those geometric properties as structure-preserving transformations in and of themselves rather than being the results of other transformations. For example, Alexander claims that levels of scale will arise naturally as a result of structure-preserving transformations, but notes that this can also be viewed as a transformation that introduces level of scale into a given structure. A skilled designer would use this transformation to add depth to a particular part of the system that was being built.

Alexander contrasts structure-preserving transformations with "structure-destroying transformations", which he feels are common in modern architecture. Alexander himself does express some sympathy for those who have used these processes to design buildings that he feels are devoid of life:

"I do not, directly, blame all the architects who have made these buildings in so many places on earth. I believe it is inappropriate to feel anger towards them... Rather, I believe that we must acknowledge that the architects (often our own colleagues) who drew these buildings, and then had them built by methods and processes far from their control, deserve our sympathy for being placed in an impossible position. What has caused the new tradition of structure-destroying forms of this era, are mainly the machine-like processes of planning, conceiving, budgeting, developing, construction contracting, construction labor, and so forth. The architects who fully accepted the modern machine have hardly been more than pawns in the game which is much larger than they are."

== A Vision of a Living World ==
Volume 3 presents buildings by Alexander and those of his contemporaries who have used similar methods consistent with the theory of living process. The projects include neighborhoods, housing built by people for themselves, public buildings, public urban spaces, ornament, colors, and details of construction.

== The Luminous Ground ==
Volume 4 addresses the cosmological implications of the theory presented in earlier volumes. The book begins with a critique of current cosmological thinking, and its separation from personal feeling and value. The outline of a theory in which matter itself is more spirit-like, more personal in character, is sketched. It is propored that the analytical and emotional self must be harnessed simultaneously to create a living world.

Alexander breaks away from the one-sided mechanical model of buildings or neighborhoods as assemblages of technically generated, interchangeable parts, and argues that a spiritual, emotional, and personal basis must underlie every act of building or making.

== See also ==
- Mathematics and architecture
- Consilience
