= Sara Ishikawa =

American architect

Sara Ishikawa is an architect and academic specializing in people-space relationships. She is a professor emerita at the College of Environmental Design, University of California, Berkeley. She is co-author of A Pattern Language, The Oregon Experiment and Houses Generated By Patterns.

She earned her Bachelor of Architecture degree from University of California, Berkeley.
