= A Pattern Language =

1977 nonfiction book by Christopher Alexander

A Pattern Language: Towns, Buildings, Construction
- Author: Christopher Alexander, Sara Ishikawa, Murray Silverstein
- Subject: Architecture
- Publisher: Oxford University Press
- Publication date: 1977; 49 years ago
- Pages: 1071
- ISBN: 0-19-501919-9
- LC Class: HT166.A6147
- Preceded by: The Timeless Way of Building
- Followed by: The Oregon Experiment

A Pattern Language: Towns, Buildings, Construction is a 1977 book on architecture, urban design, and community livability. It was authored by Christopher Alexander, Sara Ishikawa and Murray Silverstein of the Center for Environmental Structure of Berkeley, California, with writing credits also to Max Jacobson, Ingrid Fiksdahl-King and Shlomo Angel. Decades after its publication, it is still one of the best-selling books on architecture.

The book creates a new language, what the authors call a pattern language derived from timeless entities called patterns. As they write on page xxxv of the introduction, "All 253 patterns together form a language." Patterns describe a problem and then offer a solution. In doing so the authors intend to give ordinary people, not only professionals, a way to work with their neighbors to improve a town or neighborhood, design a house for themselves or work with colleagues to design an office, workshop, or public building such as a school.

== Structure ==
Written in the 1970s at the University of California, Berkeley, A Pattern Language is structured as a network, where each pattern may have a statement referenced to another pattern by placing that pattern's number in brackets, for example: (12) means go to the Community of 7,000 pattern.

It includes 253 patterns and is written as a set of problems and documented solutions.

According to the authors, the work originated from an observation

At the core […] is the idea people should design their homes, streets, and communities. This idea […] comes from the observation most of the wonderful places of the world were not made by architects, but by the people.

— Christopher Alexander et al., A Pattern Language, front bookflap

The book primarily describes its patterns verbally, but has supporting illustrations. It describes exact methods for constructing designs at every scale, from entire regions, through cities, neighborhoods, gardens, buildings, rooms, built-in furniture, and fixtures down to the level of doorknobs. The patterns are regarded by the authors not as infallible, but as hypotheses:

[…] each pattern represents our current best guess as to what arrangement of the physical environment will work to solve the problem presented. The empirical questions center on the problem—does it occur and is it felt in the way we describe it?—and the solution—does the arrangement we propose solve the problem? And the asterisks represent our degree of faith in these hypotheses. But of course, no matter what the asterisks say, the patterns are still hypotheses, all 253 of them—and are, therefore, all tentative, all free to evolve under the impact of new experience and observation.

— Christopher Alexander et al., A Pattern Language, p. xv

=== Towns ===
"We begin with that part of the language which defines a town or community. These patterns can never be 'designed' or 'built' in one fell swoop—but patient piecemeal growth, designed in such a way that every individual act is always helping to create or generate these larger global patterns, will, slowly and surely, over the years, make a community that has these global patterns in it."

=== Construction ===
Some patterns focus on materials:

We believe ultra-lightweight concrete is one of the most fundamental bulk materials of the future.

— Christopher Alexander et al., A Pattern Language, p. 958

Other patterns focus on life experiences such as the Street Cafe (Pattern 88):

The street cafe provides a unique setting, special to cities: a place people can sit lazily, legitimately, be on view, and watch the world go by […]. Encourage local cafes to spring up in each neighborhood. Make them intimate places, with several rooms, open to a busy path, so people can sit with a coffee or a drink, and watch the world go by. Build the front of the cafe so a set of tables stretch out of the cafe, right into the street.

— Christopher Alexander et al., A Pattern Language, p. 437,439

Grouping these patterns, the authors say, they form a kind of language, each pattern forming a word or thought of a true language rather than a prescriptive way to design or solve a problem. As the authors write on p xiii, "Each solution is stated in such a way, it gives the essential field of relationships needed to solve the problem, but in a very general and abstract way—so you can solve the problem, in your way, by adapting it to your preferences, and the local conditions at the place you are making it."

According to the authors, all the patterns were tested in the real world and then reviewed by multiple architects for beauty and practicality. The patterns include provision for future modification and repair.

== Reception ==
This book's method was adopted by the University of Oregon, as described in The Oregon Experiment, and remains the official planning instrument. It is adopted, in part, by some government agents as a building code.

Alexander's conception of patterns, and pattern languages, were major factors in the creation of Ward Cunningham's WikiWikiWeb, the first wiki, intended as an archive and discussion web application for the Portland Pattern Repository.

The idea of a pattern language applies to many complex engineering tasks. It is especially influential in software engineering, where design patterns are used to document collective knowledge in the field. In that field, it was a major inspiration to Richard P. Gabriel before he wrote Patterns of Software.

Will Wright cited the book as one of his inspirations for creating SimCity 2000.

Tim Berners-Lee chose the book as his desert island book on Desert Island Discs broadcast on 21 November 2025.

== Other titles in the series ==
The eight books in the Center for Environmental Structure Series are:

- The Timeless Way of Building (volume 1)
- A Pattern Language: Towns, Buildings, Construction (volume 2)
- The Oregon Experiment (volume 3)
- The Production of Houses (volume 4)
- The Linz Café (volume 5)
- A New Theory of Urban Design (volume 6)
- A Foreshadowing of 21st Century Art (volume 7)
- The Mary Rose Museum (volume 8)
