= Built environment =

Human-made space in which people live, work and recreate on a day-to-day basis

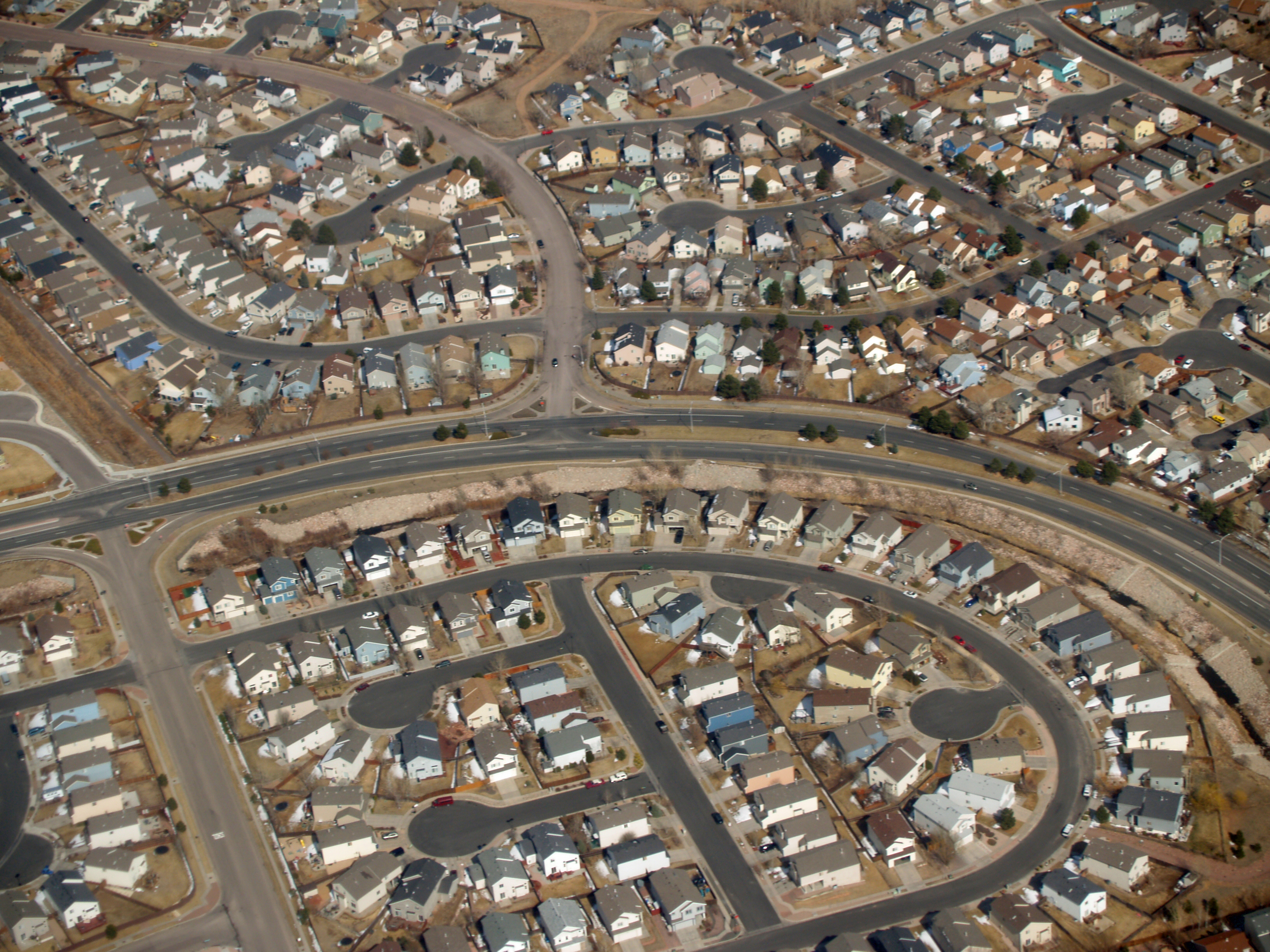
Part of the built environment: suburban tract housing in Colorado Springs, Colorado

The term built environment refers to human-made conditions and is often used in architecture, landscape architecture, urban planning, public health, sociology, and anthropology, among others. These curated spaces provide the setting for human activity and were created to fulfill human desires and needs. The term can refer to a plethora of components including the traditionally associated buildings, cities, public infrastructure, transportation, open space, as well as more conceptual components like farmlands, dammed rivers, wildlife management, and even domesticated animals.

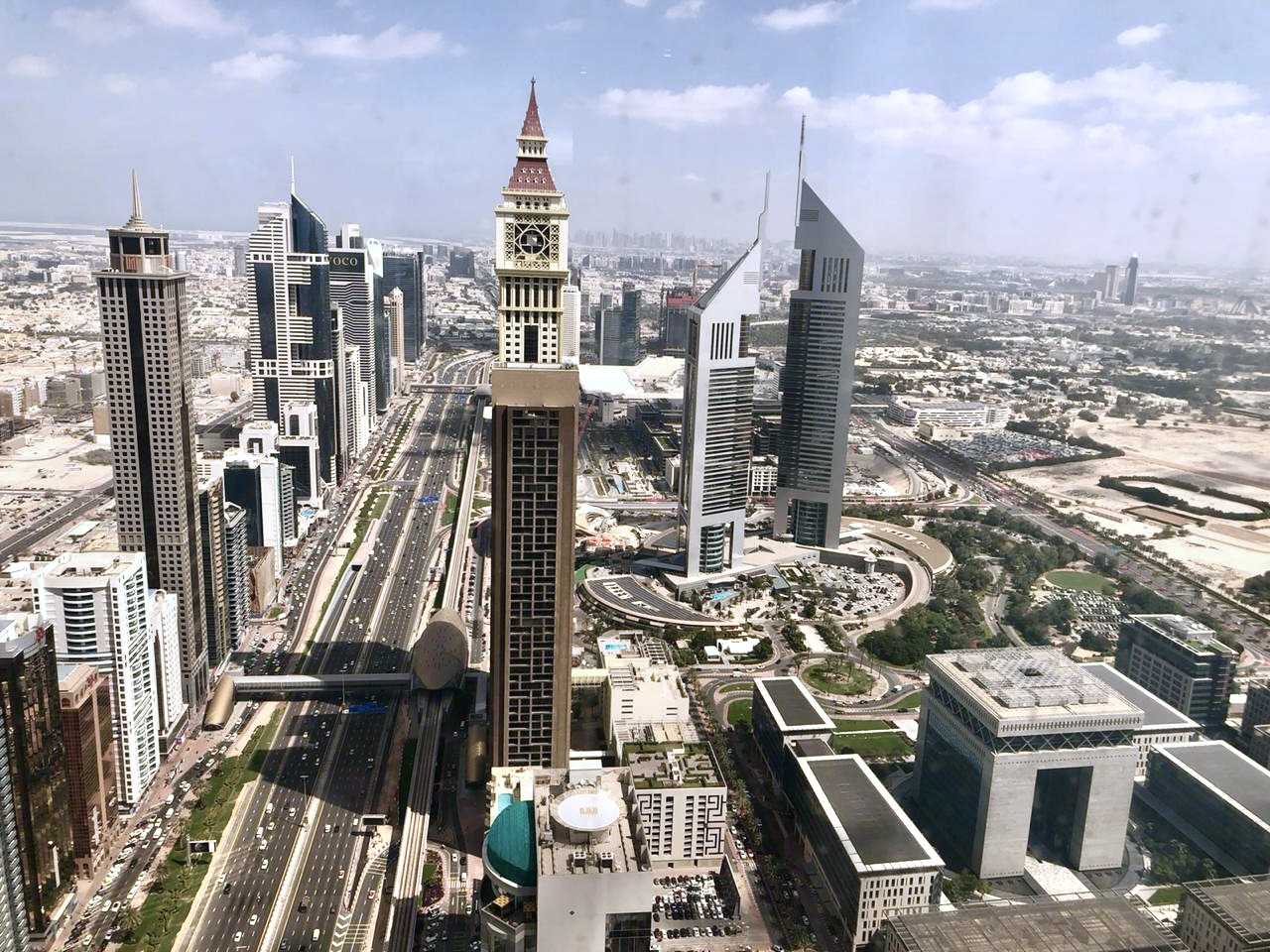
High-rise structures and major highway infrastructure as an example of the built environment in Dubai, UAE

The built environment is made up of physical features. However, when studied, the built environment often highlights the connection between physical space and social consequences. It impacts the environment and how society physically maneuvers and functions, as well as less tangible aspects of society such as socioeconomic inequity and health. Various aspects of the built environment contribute to scholarship on housing and segregation, physical activity, food access, climate change, and environmental racism.

== Features ==
There are multiple different components that make up the built environment. Below are some prominent examples of what makes up the urban fabric:

=== Buildings ===
Buildings are used for a multitude of purposes: residential, commercial, community, institutional, and governmental. Building interiors are often designed to mediate external factors and provide space to conduct activities, whether that is to sleep, eat, work, etc. The structure of the building helps define the space around it, giving form to how individuals move through the space around the building:

=== Public infrastructure ===
Public infrastructure covers a variety of things like roads, highways, pedestrian circulation, public transportation, and parks:

Roads and highways are an important feature of the built environment that enable vehicles to access a wide range of urban and non urban spaces. They are often compared to the arteries and veins of a cardiovascular system insofar as they circulate people and materials throughout a city similar to how arteries and veins circulate molecules like oxygen, glucose, and hormones between the heart and the cells, which is required for cell survival and optimal functioning. . Pedestrian circulation is vital for the walkability of a city and general access on a human scale. The quality of sidewalks and walkways has an impact on safety and accessibility for those using these spaces. Public transportation is essential in urban areas, particularly in cities and areas that have a diverse population and income range:

=== Agriculture ===
Agricultural production accounts for roughly 52% of U.S. land use. Not only does population growth cause an expansion of cities, it also necessitates more agriculture to accommodate the demand for food for an expanding population:

== History ==
"Built environment" as a term was coined in the 1980s, becoming widespread in the 1990s and places the concept in direct contrast to the supposedly "unbuilt" environment. The term describes a wide range of fields that form an interdisciplinary concept that has been accepted as an idea since classical antiquity and potentially before. Through the study of anthropology, the progression of the built environment into what it is today has been able to be examined. When people are able to travel outside of urban centers and areas where the built environment is already prominent, it pushes the boundaries of said built environment into new areas. While there are other factors that influence the built environment, like advancements in architecture or agriculture, transportation allowed for the spread and expansion of the built environment.

=== Pre–industrial Revolution ===
Agriculture, the cultivation of soil to grow crops and animals to provide food as well as products, was first developed about 12,000 years ago. This switch, also called the Neolithic Revolution, was the beginning of favoring permanent settlements and altering the land to grow crops and farm animals. This can be thought of as the start of the built environment, the first attempt to make permanent changes to the surrounding environment for human needs. The first appearance of cities was around 7500 BCE, dotted along where land was fertile and good for agricultural use. In these early communities, a priority was to ensure basic needs were being met. The built environment, while not as extensive as it is today, was beginning to be cultivated with the implementation of buildings, paths, farm land, domestication of animals and plants, etc. Over the next several thousand years, these smaller cities and villages grew into larger ones where trade, culture, education, and economics were driving factors. As cities began to grow, they needed to accommodate more people, as well as shifted from focusing on meeting survival needs to prioritizing comfort and desires – there are still many individuals today who do not have their basic needs met and this idea of a shift is within the framework of the evolution of society. This shift caused the built aspect of these cities to grow and expand to meet the growing population needs:

=== Industrial Revolution ===
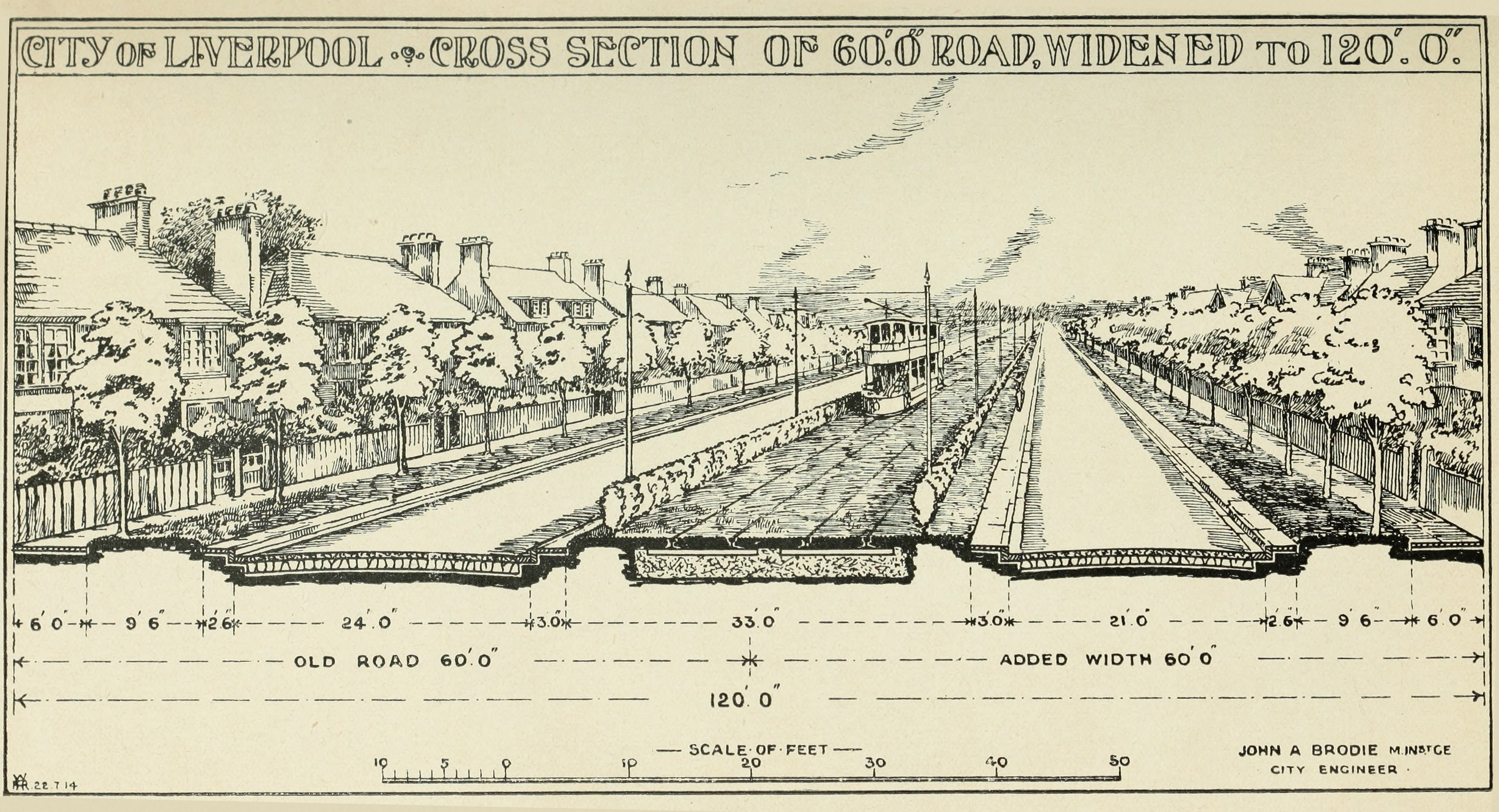
1914 proposed street drawing

The pinnacle of city growth was during the Industrial Revolution due to the demand for jobs created by the rise in factories. Cities rapidly grew from the 1880s to the early 1900s within the United States. This demand led individuals to move from farms to cities which resulted in the need to expand city infrastructure and created a boom in population size. This rapid growth in population in cities led to issues of noise, sanitation, health problems, traffic jams, pollution, compact living quarters, etc. In response to these issues, mass transit, trolleys, cable cars, and subways, were built and prioritized in an effort to improve the quality of the built environment. An example of this during the industrial revolution was the City Beautiful movement. The City Beautiful movement emerged in the 1890s as a result of the disorder and unhealthy living conditions within industrial cities. The movement promoted improved circulation, civic centers, better sanitation, and public spaces. With these improvements, the goal was to improve the quality of life for those living in them, as well as make them more profitable. The City Beautiful movement, while declining in popularity over the years, provided a range of urban reforms. The movement highlighted city planning, civic education, public transportation, and municipal housekeeping.

=== Post Industrial Revolution to present ===
The invention of cars, as well as train usage, became more accessible to the general masses due to the advancements in the steel, chemicals, and fuel generated production. In the 1920s, cars became more accessible to the general public due to Henry Ford's advances in the assembly line production. With this new burst of personal transportation, new infrastructure was built to accommodate. Freeways were first built in 1956 to attempt to eliminate unsafe roads, traffic jams, and insufficient routes. The creation of freeways and interstate transportation systems opened up the possibility and ease of transportation outside a person's city. This allowed ease of travel not previously found and changed the fabric of the built environment. New streets were being built within cities to accommodate cars as they became increasingly popular, railway lines were being built to connect areas not previously connected, for both public transportation as well as goods transportation. With these changes, the scope of a city began to expand outside its borders. The widespread use of cars and public transportation allowed for the implementation of suburbs; the working individual was able to commute long distances to work everyday. Suburbs blurred the line of city "borders", the day-to-day life that may have originally been relegated to a pedestrian radius now encompassed a wide range of distances due to the use of cars and public transportation. This increased accessibility allowed for the continued expansion of the built environment:

Currently, the built environment is typically used to describe the interdisciplinary field that encompasses the design, construction, management, and use of human-made physical influence as an interrelated whole. The concept also includes the relationship of these elements of the built environment with human activities over time—rather than a particular element in isolation or at a single moment in time, these aspects act together via the multiplier effect. The field today draws upon areas such as economics, law, public policy, sociology, anthropology, public health, management, geography, design, engineering, technology, and environmental sustainability to create a large umbrella that is the built environment.

There are some in modern academia who look at the built environment as all-encompassing, that there is no natural environment left. This argument comes from the idea that the built environment not only refers to that which is built, arranged, or curated, but also to what is managed, controlled, or allowed to continue. What is referred to as "nature" today can be seen as only a commodity that is placed into an environment that is constructed to fulfill the human will and desire. This commodity allows humans to enjoy the view and experience of nature without it inconveniencing their day-to-day life. It can be argued that the forests and wild-life parks that are held on a pedestal and are seemingly natural are, in reality, curated and allowed to exist for the enjoyment of the human experience. The planet has been irrevocably changed by human interaction. Wildlife has been hunted, harvested, brought to the brink of extinction, modified to fit human needs, the list goes on. This argument juxtaposes the argument that the built environment is only what is built, that the forests, oceans, wildlife, and other aspects of nature are their own entity:

== Impact ==
The term built environment encompasses a broad range of categories, all of which have potential impacts. When looking at these potential impacts, the environment, as well as people, are heavily affected:

=== Health ===
The built environment can heavily impact the public's health. Historically, unsanitary conditions and overcrowding within cities and urban environments have led to infectious diseases and other health threats. Dating back to Georges-Eugene Haussmann's comprehensive plans for urban Paris in the 1850s, concern for lack of air-flow and sanitary living conditions has inspired many strong city planning efforts. During the 19th century in particular, the connection between the built environment and public health became more apparent as life expectancy decreased and diseases, as well as epidemics, increased. Today, the built environment can expose individuals to pollutants or toxins that cause chronic diseases like asthma, diabetes, and coronary vascular disease, along with many others. There is evidence to suggest that chronic disease can be reduced through healthy behaviors like a proper active lifestyle, good nutrition, and reduced exposure to toxins and pollutants. Yet, the built environment is not always designed to facilitate those healthy behaviors. Many urban environments, in particular suburbs, are automobile reliant, making it difficult or unreasonable to walk or bike to places. This condition not only adds to pollution, but can also make it hard to maintain a proper active lifestyle. Public health research has expanded the list of concerns associated with the built environment to include healthy food access, community gardens, mental health, physical health, walkability, and cycling mobility. Designing areas of cities with good public health is linked to creating opportunities for physical activity, community involvement, and equal opportunity within the built environment. Urban forms that encourage physical activity and provide adequate public resources for involvement and upward mobility are proven to have far healthier populations than those that discourage such uses of the built environment.

=== Social ===
==== Housing and segregation ====
Features in the built environment present physical barriers which constitute the boundaries between neighborhoods. Roads and railways, for instance, play a large role in how people can feasibly navigate their environment. This can result in the isolation of certain communities from various resources and from each other. The placement of roads, highways, and sidewalks also determines what access people have to jobs and childcare close to home, especially in areas where most people do not own vehicles. Walkability directly influences community, so the way a neighborhood is built affects the outcomes and opportunities of the community that lives there. Even less physically imposing features, such as architectural design, can distinguish the boundaries between communities and decrease movement across neighborhood lines.

The segregation of communities is significant because the qualities of any given space directly impact the wellbeing of the people who live and work there. George Galster and Patrick Sharkey refer to this variation in geographic context as "spatial opportunity structure", and claim that the built environment influences socioeconomic outcomes and general welfare. For instance, the history of redlining and housing segregation means that there is less green space in many Black and Hispanic neighborhoods. Access to parks and green space has been proven to be good for mental health which puts these communities at a disadvantage. The historical segregation has contributed to environmental injustice, as these neighborhoods suffer from hotter summers since urban asphalt absorbs more heat than trees and grass. The effects of spatial segregation initiatives in the built environment, such as redlining in the 1930s and 1940s, are long lasting. The inability to feasibly move from forcibly economically depressed areas into more prosperous ones creates fiscal disadvantages that are passed down generationally. With proper public education access tied to the economic prosperity of a neighborhood, many formerly redlined areas continue to lack educational opportunities for residents and, thus, job and higher-income opportunities are limited.

=== Environmental ===
The built environment has a multitude of impacts on the planet, some of the most prominent effects are greenhouse gas emissions and Urban Heat Island Effect.

The built environment expands along with factors like population and consumption which directly impact the output of greenhouse gases. As cities and urban areas grow, the need for transportation and structures grows as well. In 2006, transportation accounted for 28% of total greenhouse gas emissions in the U.S. Building's design, location, orientation, and construction process heavily influence greenhouse gas emissions. Commercial, industrial, and residential buildings account for roughly 43% of U.S. CO_{2} emissions in energy usage. In 2005, agricultural land use accounted for 10–12% of total human-caused greenhouse gas emissions worldwide.

Urban heat islands are pockets of higher temperature areas, typically within cities, that effect the environment, as well as quality of life. Urban Heat Islands are caused by reduction of natural landscape in favor of urban materials like asphalt, concrete, brick, etc. This change from natural landscape to urban materials is the epitome of the built environment and its expansion:

== See also ==
- Center for the Built Environment
- City planning
- Environmental psychology
- Environmental sustainability
- Healing environments
- Healthy building
- Indoor air quality
- International Association of People-Environment Studies
- Microbiomes of the built environment
- National Building Museum
- Natural environment
- Public health
- Social environment
- Urbanism
- Urban planning
- Vernacular architecture
- Weatherization
