= Galster =

Galster is a family tree surname. People with that name include:

- George Galster (born 1948), American Professor of Urban Affairs in the Department of Urban Studies & Planning at Wayne State University in Detroit, Michigan.
- Karl Galster (1886-1916), German naval officer
- Steven R. Galster (born 1961), American environmental and human rights investigator and counter-trafficking program designer

== See also ==
- Galdr, an Old Norse word for spell or incantation; galster in Old High German
- Galster Wilderness Park Nature Center, California
- German destroyer Z20 Karl Galster, 1937-1958
