= Perla Serfaty =

French sociologist

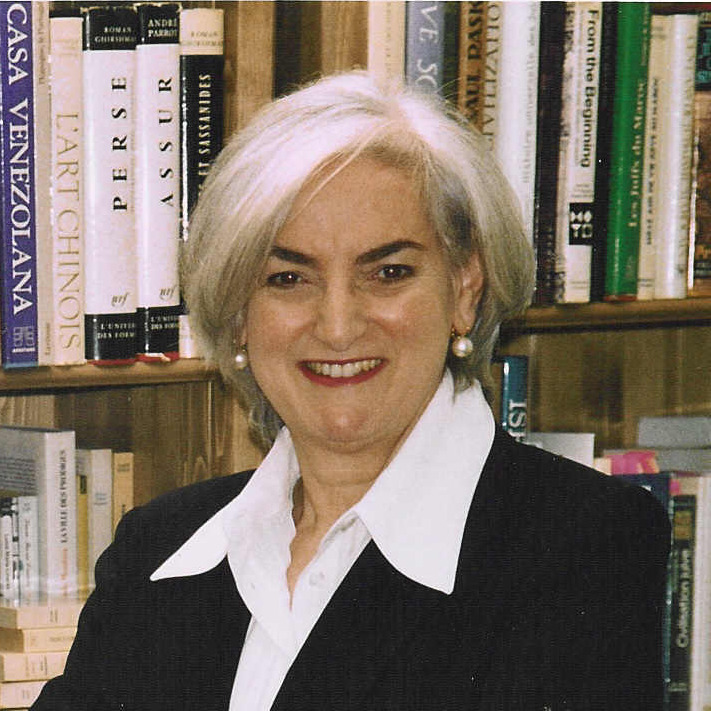
- Perla Serfaty (2016)
- Born: 1944 (age 81–82); Marrakesh, Morocco
- Other names: Perla Serfaty-Garzon; Perla Korosec-Serfaty
- Citizenship: France; Canada
- Occupations: Academic; sociologist; psychosociologist; writer
- Awards: J. I. Segal Jewish Book Award

Academic background
- Education: Ph.D.
- Alma mater: University of Strasbourg

Academic work
- Institutions: University of Strasbourg
- Website: https://perlaserfaty.net/

Perla Serfaty (pen names, Perla Serfaty-Garzon and Perla Korosec-Serfaty; born in 1944 in Marrakesh, Morocco) is a French and Canadian academic, sociologist, psychosociologist, writer, and essayist, known in particular for her work on home and intimacy. She is a theorist of domestic intimacy, hospitality and the appropriation of inhabited places, and an expert in environmental psychology. Her book Vieillesse et Engendrements. La longévité dans la tradition juive., dedicated to the traditional Jewish view of longevity as transmitted by the Hebrew Bible, was awarded the J. I. Segal Jewish Book Award in 2014. The contribution of Serfaty's work to environmental psychology was distinguished by her induction in 2018 into the International Association of People-Environment Studies (IAPS) Hall of Fame.

== Early life and education ==
Perla Serfaty moved to France in 1964. She studied philosophy, psychology, and sociology at the University of Strasbourg, where she followed the teachings of Georges Gusdorf, André Canivez, Georges Lanteri-Laura, Didier Anzieu, and Henri Lefebvre. She joined the laboratory of Professor Paul-Henry Chombart de Lauwe at the School for Advanced Studies in the Social Sciences, (École Pratique des Hautes Études en Sciences Sociales), Paris V – Sorbonne, where she received her doctorate in literature and humanities (1985, sociologie).

== Career and research ==
Appointed to the Institute of Psychology at the University of Strasbourg in 1969, she introduced into her teaching environmental psychology, a young discipline that was not taught in France at the time, where it was still practically unknown. Serfaty took an active part in the development of research in environmental psychology as well as in its institutional recognition.

She organized the first international conference devoted to environmental psychology to be held in France: the 3rd International Architectural Psychology Conference (IAPC) (Strasbourg, 1976), ), in Strasbourg, the theme of which was ‘The Appropriation of Space.’ The creation of the IAPS (International Association of People-Environmental Studies) in 1981 consolidated, institutionalized and gave formal recognition to the international character of the IAPC.

Perla Serfaty took an active part in the development of research and theory of Environmental Psychology as well as in its institutional recognition as well as in the conceptualization within the framework of this discipline of the notions of dwelling, ‘chez-soi,’ hospitality, loss of home in migration, as well as of appropriation of space.

Among Perla Serfaty's research interests are also sociability and the modes of appropriation of public urban spaces, the transformation of the meaning of protection of architectural and urban heritage as well as of intangible cultural heritage.

== Awards and honours ==
- 2014, J. I. Segal Jewish Book Award
- 2018, induction into the International Association of People-Environment Studies (IAPS) Hall of Fame

== Selected works ==
- Serfaty-Garzon, Perla (2016). Quand votre maison vous est contée (in French). Bayard Canada. ISBN 978-2-89579-768-5. OCLC 991381693.
- Serfaty-Garzon, Perla (2014). Vieillesse et engendrements (in French). Novalis. ISBN 978-2-89646-656-6. OCLC 937593826. (Prix J.I.-Segal, 2014)
- Serfaty-Garzon, Perla (30 April 2008). Marre d'être la fée du logis ?: Paradoxes de la femme d'aujourd'hui (in French). Armand Colin. ISBN 978-2-200-24362-3. OCLC 1041211802.
- Serfaty-Garzon, Perla (2006). Enfin chez soi? (in French). Bayard Canada Livres. ISBN 978-2-89579-815-6. OCLC 1269054550.
- Serfaty-Garzon, Perla (2006). Un chez-soi chez les autres (in French). Bayard Canada. ISBN 978-2-89579-811-8. OCLC 1256742953.
- Serfaty-Garzon, Perla (13 November 2003). Chez soi: Les territoires de l'intimité (in French). Armand Colin. ISBN 978-2-200-35643-9.
- Serfaty-Garzon, Perla (1999). Psychologie de la maison: une archéologie de l'intimité (in French). Editions Cursus Universitaire. ISBN 978-2-89546-001-5. OCLC 313654636.
- Carreau, Serge; Serfaty-Garzon, Perla; Québec (Province). Ministère de la culture et des communications (1998). Le patrimoine de Montréal: document de référence (in French). Gouvernement du Québec, Ministère de la culture et des communications. ISBN 978-2-89417-777-8. OCLC 43281621.
- Korosec-Serfaty, Perla, La Grand'place. Pratiques quotidiennes et identité de lieu, Paris, Éditions du CNRS, 1986
- Korosec-Serfaty, Perla (1982). The Main Square: Functions and Daily Uses of Stortorget in Malmoe. Aris. ISBN 9789197045407. OCLC 1049275642.
- Korosec-Serfaty, Perla (1979). Une maison à soi: déterminants psychologiques et sociaux de l'habitat individuel (in French). Verlag nicht ermittelbar. OCLC 490940817.
- Korosec-Serfaty, Perla, ed. (1976). Appropriation de l'espace (in French). Universite Louis Pasteur. OCLC 757287074.
