= Brief =

Brief, briefs, or briefing may refer to:

== Documents ==
- Brief (architecture), a type of educational or business document including desires and requirements
- Brief (law), any of a number of formal document types
- Briefing note, or memo, a written message used in a professional setting
- Creative brief, a document used by creative professionals and agencies to develop creative deliverables
- Design brief, a type of educational or business document including desires and requirements
- Letter (message), a written or typed message from one person or group to another
- Papal brief, a papal letter less formal than a bull, sealed with the pope's signet ring or stamped with the device borne on this ring

== Entertainment ==
- Brief, a fictional character in the Panty & Stocking with Garterbelt anime
- The Brief, an Australian podcast series hosted on Southern Cross Austereo's LiSTNR platform
- Dr. Briefs, a fictional character in the Dragon Ball manga and anime series
- The Briefs, a Seattle band

== Other uses ==
=== Brief ===
- Behavior Rating Inventory of Executive Function (BRIEF), a behavioral assessment for children and adolescents
- Brief (garden), a garden in Sri Lanka designed by landscape architect Bevis Bawa
- Brief (text editor), a popular text editor for the MS-DOS operating system

=== Briefs ===
- Briefs, a type of underwear and swimwear
- Ulrich Briefs (1939–2005), German politician

=== Briefing ===
- The Briefing, evangelical Christian magazine
- The Briefing: Politics, the Press, and the President, a 2018 memoir by Trump Administration press secretary Sean Spicer

== See also ==
- Brief intervention, a technique used to address alcohol abuse
- Brief therapy, an umbrella term for psychotherapy approaches
- Watching brief, an archaeological recording method
- Debriefing
