= Performance-based building design =

Performance-based building design is an approach to the design of any complexity of building, from single-detached homes up to and including high-rise apartments and office buildings. A building constructed in this way is required to meet certain measurable or predictable performance requirements, such as energy efficiency or seismic load, without a specific prescribed method by which to attain those requirements. This is in contrast to traditional prescribed building codes, which mandate specific construction practices, such as stud size and distance between studs in wooden frame construction. Such an approach provides the freedom to develop tools and methods to evaluate the entire life cycle of the building process, from the business dealings, to procurement, through construction and the evaluation of results.

== Background ==
One of the first implementations of performance-based building design requirements was in Hammurabi's Code (c. 1795 to 1750 BC), where is stated that "a house should not collapse and kill anybody". This concept is also described in Vitruvius's "De architectura libri decem" ("The Ten Books of Architecture") in first century BC.In modern times, the first definition of performance-based building design was introduced in 1965 in France by Blachère with the Agrément system

Despite this, the building process remained relatively conventional for the next 50 years, based solely on experience and codes, regulations prescribed by law which stifled innovations and change. The prescription approach is a technical procedure based on past experience which consists of comparing the proposed design with standardized codes, so no simulation or verification tools are needed for the design and building process.

A new approach began to emerge during the second half of the 20th century, when many local building markets began to show that they needed greater flexibility in the procurement procedures to facilitate the exchange of building goods between countries and to improve the speed of procedures and innovations in the building process. This innovative approach to the procurement, design, contracting, management and maintenance of buildings was performance-based building design (PBBD).

Most recently the clearest definition of performance based building approach was explained in 1982 by the CIB W60 Commission in the report n.64, where Gibson stated that "first and foremost, the performance approach is [...] the practice of thinking and working in terms of ends rather than means.[ …] It is concerned with what a building or building product is required to do, and not with prescribing how it is to be constructed".

Many research establishments have studied the implementation of PBBD during the last fifty years. A majority of areas of building design remain open to innovation.

During 1998-2001, the CIB Board and Programme Committee initiated the Proactive Programme on Performance-Based Building in order to practically implement technical developments of performance-based building. This programme was followed by the establishment of the Performance-Based Building (PeBBu), running from October 2001 to October 2005, thanks to funds from the European Commission (EC) Fifth Framework Programme.

The PeBBu Network had a broad and varied programme, a set of activities and produced many papers to aid in the implementation of such vision.

== PeBBu Thematic Network ==
PeBBu Thematic Network was managed by the CIB General Secretariat (International Council for Research and Innovation in Building Construction), particularly by the CIB Development Foundation (CIBdf). The PeBBu Network started working in 2001 and completed in 2005. In the PeBBu Network 73 organisations, included CIBdf (coordinating contractor), BBRI (Belgium), VTT (Finland), CSTB (France), EGM (Netherlands), TNO (Netherlands), BRE (UK), cooperated to this project bringing people together to share their work, their information and knowledge. The objectives of the Network was to stimulate and facilitate international dissemination and implementation of Performance Based Building in building and construction sector, maximising the contribution to this by the international Research and Development community. The PeBBu Thematic Network result is described and explained in 26 final reports which included three reports with an overall PBB scope, a multitude of research reports from the PeBBu Domains, User Platforms and Regional Platforms, a Final Management report and four practice reports for providing practical support to the actual application of PBB concept in building and construction sector.

== PBB: Conceptual framework ==
A conceptual framework for implementing a PBB market was identified while reviewing various viewpoints during the compilation of the 2nd International State of the Art Report for the PeBBu Thematic Network (Becker and Foliente 2005). The building facility is a multi-component system with a generally very long life cycle. The system's design agenda as a whole, and the more specific design objectives of its parts, originate from relevant user requirements. These requirements evolve into a comprehensive set of Performance Requirements that should be established by a large number of stakeholders (the users, entrepreneur/owner, regulatory framework, design team, and manufacturers).

The main steps in a Performance Based Building Design process are:

1. identifying and formulating the relevant User Requirements
2. transforming the User Requirements identified into Performance Requirements and quantitative performance criteria
3. using reliable design and evaluation tools to assess whether proposed solutions meet the stated criteria at a satisfactory level

=== Performance concept ===
In a Performance-based approach, the focus of all decisions, is on the required performance-in-use and on the evaluations and testing of building asset. Performance Based Building (PBB) is focused on performance required in use for the business processes and the needs of the users, and then on the evaluations and verification of building assets result. The Performance approach can be used whether the process is about an existing or new assets. It is applicable to the procurement of constructed assets and to any phase of the whole life cycle Building Process, such as strategic planning, asset management, briefing/programming, design and construction, operation and maintenance, management and use, renovations and alterations, codes, regulations and standards. It includes many topics and criteria, which can be categorized as physical, functional, environmental, financial, economical, psychological, social, facilities, and other more. These criteria are related to singular project, according to the context and the situation.

=== Two key characteristics of performance concept ===
Performance concept is based on two key characteristics:

- the use of two languages, one for the clients/users requirements and the other for the supply of the performance
- the need for validation and verification of results against performance targets

==== Two languages ====
The Performance concept requires two languages: the language of demand requirements and the language of the required performance which should have a capability to fulfill the demand. It is important to recognize that these languages are different. Szigeti and Davis (Performance Based Building: Conceptual Framework, 2005) explain that "the dialog between client and supplier can be described as two halves of a "hamburger bun", with the statement of the requirement in functional or performance language (FC - functional concept) matched to a solution (SC - solution concept) in more technical language, and the matching, verification / validation that needs to occur in between".

In a recent paper Ang, Groosman, and Scholten (2005) explain that the functional concept represents the set of unquantified objectives and scopes to be satisfied by the supply solutions, related to performance requirements. The solution concept represents technical realization that satisfies at least the required performance. Design decision is a development of a solution concept.

==== Assessing result – match and compare ====
Building performance evaluation is the process of systematically comparing and matching the performance in use of building assets with explicitly documented or implicitly criteria for their expected performance. In the PBB approach is essential matching and comparing demand and supply. It can be done by using a validation method, by measurement, calculation, or testing. Tools and methods are used to permit some form of measurement of testing of the requirements, and the relating measurement of the capability of assets to perform.

There are many types of in-depth specialized technical evaluations and audits. These validations generally require time, a major effort by the customer group, and a high level of funding. Normally, the most valuable methods and tools are comprehensive scans which are performance based and include metrics that can easily be measured without lab-type instruments. Evaluations and reviews, are integral part of asset and portfolio management, design, construction, commissioning. Evaluations can be used for different purposes, depending on the requirements being considered, for example they could be used in support of funding decisions, they could include a condition assessment to ensure that the level of degradation or the obsolescence is known, they could include an assessment of the utilization or an assessment of the capability of the product result to perform functional expected requirements. Such evaluations can be used at any time during the life cycle of the asset. PBB evaluations should be done in a routine manner, really the evaluations are often done only as part of Commissioning or shortly thereafter, or when there is a problem.

There are two different kinds of performance verifications. Performance evaluations rate the physical asset according to a set of existing criteria and indicators of capability, and match the results against the required levels of performance. The Occupant Satisfaction Surveys record the perceptions of the users, usually through a scale of satisfaction measurements. Both types of evaluations complement each other.

==== Tools ====
Innovative decision-support methodologies are taking place in building sector. There are some tools explicitly based on the demand and supply concepts and other ones which employ standardized performance metrics that for the first time link facility condition to the functional requirements of organizations and their customers. Projects can be planned, prioritize, and budgeted using a multi-criteria approach, that is transparent, comprehensive and auditable. One of the methodologies that can be used is a gap analysis based on calibrated scales that measure both the levels of requirements and the capability of the asset that is either already used, or being designed, or offer to be bought, or leased. Such methodology is an ASTM and American National (ANSI) standard and is currently being considered as an ISO standard. It is particularly useful when the information about the "gap", if any, can be presented in support of funding decisions and actions.

There are a large number of verification methodologies, (e.g. POEs, CRE-FM), and all of these need to refer back to explicit statements of requirements to be able to compare with expected performance. To evaluate the result of a building asset against the expected performance requirements it is necessary to fix some tools used during the process. These tools are the reference of whole life cycle building process, so organizations use 'key performance indicators (KPI)' to prove that they are meeting the targets that have been set by senior management. At the same time performance measurement (PM) becomes central to managing organizations, their operations and logistic support. These methodologies include the feedback loop that links a facility in use to the requirements and capabilities that are compared and matched whenever decisions are needed.

=== Performance approach and prescriptive approach ===
A prescriptive approach describes the way a building asset must be constructed, rather than the end result of the building process, and is related to the type and quality of materials used, the method of construction, and the workmanship. This type of approach is strictly mandated by a combination of law, codes, standards, and regulations, and is based on past experience and consolidated know-how. The content of prescriptive codes and standards is usually a consequence of an accident causing injury or death which requires a remedy to avoid a repeat, as a consequence of some hazardous situation, or as a consequence of some recognized social need. In many countries, in both the public and private sector, research is taking place into a different set of codes, methods and tools based on performance criteria to complement the traditional prescriptive codes. In the 1970s, this search produced the "Nordic Model" (NKB 1978), which constituted the reference model of next performance-based codes. This model links easily to one of the key characteristics of the Performance approach, the dialog between the why, the what and the how.

Using a Performance Based approach does not preclude the use of prescriptive specifications. Although the benefits of the adopting of a PBBD approach are significant, it is recognized that employing a performance-based approach at any stage in the building process is more complex and expensive than using the simpler prescriptive route. So, the application of this approach should not be regarded as an end in itself. When simple building are concerned or well proven technologies are used, the use of prescriptive codes results more effective, efficient, faster, or less costly, so prescriptive specifications will continue to be useful in many situations.

At the same time for the complex projects use of the performance based route at every stage is indispensable, in particular during design and evaluation phases.

It is not likely that a facility will be planned, procured, delivered, maintained, used and renovated using solely Performance Based documents at each step of the way, down the supply chain, to the procurement of products and materials, because there is not yet enough experience with the Performance Based Building approach. At the same time the prescriptive approach can bring to stifle changes and innovations, so best way to set building process is blending both different approaches.

== Statements of Requirements (SoR) ==
The Statements of Requirements represents a reference for the whole life cycle management of facilities, they are the core of the conceptual framework came up from the PeBBu Thematic Network. They constitute the key to implementation of the PBB in the construction sector.

The SoRs is a document prepared by clients, or in the verbal statements communicated to supplies, it is based on the user functional needs. These user requirements are converted into performance requirements, which can be explicit or implicit. Such document should include information about what is essential to the client. SoRs will take different forms depending on the kind of client and what is being procured, at what phase of the Life Cycle or where in the supply chain a document is being used. The SoRs should be, dynamic, not static, and should include more and more details as projects proceed. This document should be prepared at different levels of granularity, how detailed the documentation is at each stage depends on the complexity of the project and on the procurement route chosen for the project.

The SoRs represent a very important part of a continuous process of communication between clients (demand) and their project team (supply), they will be updated and managed using computerized tools and will contain all requirements throughout the life of the facility. This process is called "briefing" in UK and Commonwealth English, and "programming" in American English. An SoR is normally prepared for any project, whether it is a PBB project or not. Assembling such a document usually leads to a more appropriate match between the needs of clients and users and the constructed assets. Statements of Requirements have to be very carefully stated so that it is easy to verify that a proposed solution can meet those requirements.

High level statement of requirements need to be paired with indicators of capability so design solutions can be evaluated before they are built in order to avoid mistakes. In the SoRs it is important to take into account some design aspect like flexibility indicators because constructed assets need for change during their life cycle, uses and activities can change very rapidly, so it is essential to test different solutions way that the spaces might be used according to anticipate changes. SoRs, as understood in ISO 9000, include not only what the client requires and is prepared to pay for, but also the process and indicators that will provide the means to verify, and validate, that the product or service delivered meets those stated requirements.

As part of the worldwide movement to implement a PBB approach and to develop tools that will make it easier to shift to PBB, the International Alliance for Interoperability (IAI) set up projects to map the processes that are part of Whole Life Cycle Management as Portfolio and Asset Management: Performance (PAMPeR) and Early Design" (ED). The IAI efforts are complemented by many other efforts to create standards for the information to be captured and analyzed to verify performance-in-use.

== Performance requirements (PR) ==
Performance requirements translate user requirements in more precise quantitative measurable and technical terms, usually for a specific purpose.

Supply team prepares a document that includes, objectives and goals, performance requirements and criteria. It is important to include "indicators of performance" in the way that it can be measured the results against explicit requirements, whether qualitative or quantitative. Performance indicators need to be easily understood by the users and the evaluators. To validate the indicators and verify that required performance-in-use has been achieved it is necessary using appropriate methods and tools. Levels of performance requirements can be stated as part of the preparation of SoRs, as part of project programs, or as part of requests for proposals and procurement contracts. It is preferable adopting a flexible approach to the expression and comparison of performance levels, so required and achieved performance can be expressed not as single values but as bands between upper and lower limits. In consequence, in performance terms the criteria can be expressed as graduated scales, divided into broad bands.

== Performance based codes ==
In the building and construction industry, until 25–30 years old, prescriptive codes, regulations and standards made innovation and change difficult and costly to implement, and created technical restrictions to trade. These concerns have been the major drivers towards the use of a Performance Based approach to codes, regulations and standards. Performance-based building regulations have been implemented or are being developed in many countries but they have not yet reached their full potential. In part, this can be attributed to the fact that the overall regulatory system has not yet been fully addressed, and gaps exist in several key areas. Bringing the regulatory and non-regulatory models together is probably the best way to work. This is shown in the "Total Performance System Models" diagram (Meacham, et al. 2002), that maps the flow of decision making from society and business objectives to construction solutions.

The difference between the regulatory and non-regulatory parts of the Total Performance System Models is that the first one is mandated by codes and regulations based on the law, while those other functional requirements, included in Statements of Requirements, are an integral part of what the client requires and is willing to pay for.

=== Consequences relating to procedure ===
For procurements in the public sector and for publicly traded corporations, it's important that the decisions and choices are transparent and explicit, regardless of the specific procurement route. All procurement processes can be either Prescriptive or Performance Based. Design-Build, Public Private Partnerships (PPP), private finance initiative (PFI) and similar procurement procedures are particularly suited to the use of a strong Performance Based Building application. If the expected performance are not stated explicitly and verifiably then these procurement methods will likely be more subject to disappointments and legal problems. To get the benefits from these procurement approaches, it is essential to organize the services of the supply chain in order to get innovative, less costly, or better solutions by shifting decisions about "how" to the integrated team.

== References regulatory ==
- ISO 6240: 1980, Performance standards in building – Contents and presentation
- ISO 6241: 1984, Performance standards in building – Principles for their preparation and factors to be considered
- ISO 6242: 1992, Building construction – Expression of user's requirements – Part 1: Thermal requirements
- ISO 6242: 1992, Building construction – Expression of user's requirements – Part 2: Air purity requirements
- ISO 6242: 1992, Building construction – Expression of user's requirements – Part 3: Acoustical requirements
- ISO 6243: 1997, Climatic data for building design: proposed systems of symbols
- ISO 7162: 1992, Performance standards in building – Contents and format of standards for evaluation of performance
- ISO 19208: 2016, Framework for specifying performance in buildings
- ISO 9836: 1992, Performance standards in building – Definition and calculation of area and space indicators
- ISO 9000-00: 2000a, Quality Management system - Fundamentals and vocabulary
- ISO 9001-00: 2000b, Quality Management system - Requirements
- CEN (2002). EN 12152:2002 Curtain Walling — Air Permeability —Performance Requirements and Classification. CEN, European Commission for Standardization, Brussels.
- CEN (2002 − 2007). Structural Eurocodes (EN 1990 — Eurocode: Basis of structural design. EN 1991 —Eurocode 1: Actions on structures. EN 1992 — Eurocode 2: Design of concrete structures. EN 1993 —Eurocode 3: Design of steel structures. EN 1994 — Eurocode 4: Design of composite steel and concrete structures. EN 1995 — Eurocode 5: Design of timber structures. EN 1996 — Eurocode 6: Design of masonry structures. EN 1997 — Eurocode 7: Geotechnical design. EN 1998 — Eurocode 8: Design of structures for earthquake resistance. EN 1999 — Eurocode 9: Design of aluminium structures). CEN, European Commission for Standardization, Brussels.
- CEN (2004). EN 13779:2004 — Ventilation for Non-residential Buildings — Performance Requirements for Ventilation and Room-Conditioning Systems. CEN, European committee for standardization, Brussels
- UNI 8290 – 1: 1981 + A122: 1983, Residential building. Building elements. Classification and terminology
- UNI 8290 – 2: 1983, Residential building. Building elements. Analysis of requirements
- UNI 8290 – 3: 1987, Residential building. Building elements. Agents list
- UNI 8289: 1981, Building. Functional requirements of final users. Classification
- UNI 10838: 1999, Building. Terminology for users, performances, quality and building process

== See also ==
- Evidence-based design
- Feedback loop
- Post-occupancy evaluation
