= Post-occupancy evaluation =

Post Occupancy Evaluation (POE) has its origins in Scotland and the United States and has been used in one form or another since the 1960s. Preiser and colleagues define POE as "the process of evaluating buildings in a systematic and rigorous manner after they have been built and occupied for some time".

The unique aspect of post-occupancy evaluation is that it generates recommendations based on all stakeholder groups' experiences of subject buildings' effects on productivity and wellbeing.

== Purposes of POE ==
Post-occupancy Evaluations is used to improve the ways that buildings are used to support productivity and wellbeing.

Specifically it is used to:

- Account for building quality
- Inform planning and briefing (programming) for new buildings and alterations
- Troubleshoot building/use problems (such as change management and new work styles)

The British Council for Offices (BCO) summarises that a POE provides feedback of how successful the workplace is in supporting the occupying organization and the requirements of individual end-users. The BCO also suggests that POE can be used to assess if a project brief has been met. Furthermore, the BCO recommends that POE is used as part of the Evidence-based design process, where the project usually refers to a building design fit-out or refurbishment, or to inform the project brief where the project is the introduction of a new initiative, system or process. POE usually involves feedback from the building occupants, through questionnaires, interviews and workshops, but may also involve more objective measures such as environmental monitoring, space measurement and cost analysis.

== Building interest groups ==
Post Occupancy Evaluations involve all stakeholder groups with interests in the subject buildings. Stakeholders are typically:

- Employees - working in the buildings
- Clients, customers, students, prisoners, guests and patients - receiving services in the buildings
- Project sponsors, architects, engineers, builders - who produced the building
- Maintenance managers, tradespeople and cleaners - who maintain the building
- Future generations (represented by architects) - who will live in the environment polluted by the buildings' construction and operation

== Components of POE ==
The POE process provides value-neutral prompts to stimulate stakeholders to make testable observations about their experiences of buildings' effect on productivity and wellbeing. These observations are clarified and documented by the evaluator. Stakeholders' testable observations will be specific to building design, use and operating conditions and these may involve "negotiation" of all three dimensions of building evaluation to realize the optimum ways of achieving productivity and wellbeing.

Recommendations are based on complete set of stakeholders' observations. Most recommendations are to inform planning and design of future new buildings the operational practices. They also generate some recommendations for modifications to the subject buildings and for changes in the ways that they are used. POE evaluators may recommend monitoring, research, investigation or project management studies.

Some POE include other building studies. POE incorporate may include quantitative and qualitative techniques. Most POEs will involve seeking feedback from the occupants of the place being evaluated. This may be achieved through various survey methodology including questionnaire, interview or focus group. The occupant feedback may be supplemented by environmental monitoring, such as temperature, noise levels, lighting levels and indoor air quality. More recently, POEs tend to include sustainable measures such as energy consumption, waste levels, and water usage. Other commonly used quantitative measures include space metrics, for example occupational density, space utilization and tenant efficiency ratio. Cost, either expressed as the cost of the project per square meter or the total cost of occupancy, is considered a key metric in building evaluation and may be compared with the occupant feedback to provide a better understanding of value.

University of California, Berkeley’s Center for the Built Environment (CBE) developed a web-based survey tool for building stakeholders to conduct occupant indoor environmental quality assessments. The project focuses on seven areas of performance: “thermal comfort, air quality, acoustics, lighting, cleanliness, spatial layout, and office furnishings”. The survey was first developed in 1999 by a team of engineering, architecture, and psychology experts and has since evolved to meet the needs of industry and research. The results collected over its use are stored in a single data set, allowing for the comparison of ratings across areas of performance. The CBE Occupant Survey and the analysis of its database focuses on self-report productivity, occupant satisfaction, and comparisons of building systems. It is also used by buildings seeking LEED-EB certification as well as by operators working to improve the performance of buildings.

In a 2021 lessons learned study of the Occupant Survey tool conducted by CBE, researchers suggest improvements to developing future POEs. Given recent industry interest in the inclusion of occupant health and wellbeing in environmental sustainability, CBE recommends expanding survey questions to better address occupant expectations and needs in order to address the relationship between environment and cognitive states. Questions aimed at individual or organization variables as well as occupants’ perceptions may help researchers more effectively examine drivers of environmental satisfaction. In flexible workspaces where occupants move and work freely throughout a space, as opposed to traditional more stationary offices, CBE suggests an increase in survey frequency for more comprehensive data. To avoid survey fatigue this may be accomplished through shorter surveys known as ecological momentary assessments (EMAs) along with a pairing of unobtrusive measures of behavior and environmental parameters using sensor data. CBE also recommends providing occupants with educational resources to help maximize the use of their spaces.

== Applications in Academic Research ==
The CBE Occupant Survey database is widely used in academic research to test relationships among IEQ, building characteristics, and occupant satisfaction. Standardized scales for satisfaction measures allow researchers to compare responses across buildings having different systems, or architectural features, and identify variables affecting occupants' satisfaction with workplaces. For example, Frontczak et al. (2012) used responses from over 50,000 occupants across 351 buildings to assess environmental characteristics affecting workplace satisfaction. The findings showed that satisfaction with the amount of space available for individual work and storage was the strongest predictor, followed by noise level and visual privacy, highlighting the spatial design and acoustic conditions in addition to conventional indoor environmental quality parameters. Research using POEs datasets from different countries has emphasized the importance of geographical context when evaluating workplace environments.

Also, the database has been used to evaluate the impact of green building certification systems on occupants' satisfaction. Altomonte and Schiavon (2013) compared responses across 65 LEED-certified and 79 non-certified buildings, reporting negligible differences in overall building and workspace satisfaction between the groups. This suggests that LEED certification does not lead to higher occupant satisfaction. On the other hand, Kent et al. (2024) used the CBE database to compare occupant satisfaction between 1634 surveys from LEED-certified buildings and 1634 surveys from WELL-certified buildings, showing that occupants are 39% more satisfied with WELL-certified buildings compared to LEED-certified buildings. In the studies of satisfaction in open-plan offices, Parkinson et al. (2023) used 62,360 responses from 617 office buildings to identify the sources of occupants' dissatisfaction, reporting that 81% of respondents reported dissatisfaction with at least one aspect of their workspace. Occupants in open-plan offices with low or no partitions were twice as likely to report dissatisfaction as those in private enclosed offices. Noise, insufficient space, and privacy concerns were frequently reported, which highlights the relationship between workspace configuration and occupants' experiences.

== Certification scheme ==
Both LEED and WELL consider occupant surveys as part of their certification scheme.

=== LEED v4 ===
IEQ survey, as a part of POE, is involved in LEED certification scheme v4. For all LEED O+M projects using LEED v4, one point (EQ Credit: Occupant Comfort Survey) can be awarded to those who intents to assess building occupants' comfort.

=== WELL v2 ===
WELL involves the occupant survey in both preconditions and optimization features in the concept of community. Besides, it has a particular feature related to occupant survey on thermal comfort concept.

==== Occupant Survey ====
Occupant Survey (Feature C03) is one of the precondition features of the community concept, which means it is mandatory for certification. This feature intends to establish minimum standards for the evaluation of experience and self-reported health and well-being of building occupants. The requirements of this feature are the following two parts:

- Part 1: Select project survey. This can be either a third-party survey, or a custom survey;
- Part 2: Administer survey and report results.

==== Enhanced Occupant Survey ====
Enhanced Occupant Survey (Feature C04) is an optimization feature of community concept, which helps to achieve WELL certification. The purpose of this feature is to evaluate comfort, satisfaction, behavior change, self-reported health and other robust factors related to the well-being of occupants in buildings. A project can have up to 3 points it meets below requirements:

- Part 1: Select enhanced survey. This survey can be one of the pre-approved surveys in Feature C03 Part 1 with either additional one to three modules specific to WELL or additional three to six project related topics (1 point);
- Part 2: Administer pre-occupancy survey and report results (1 point);
- Part 3: Monitor survey responses (1 point);
- Part 4: Facilitate interviews and focus groups (1 point).

==== Enhanced Thermal Performance ====
Enhanced Thermal Performance (Feature T02) is one of the optimization features of thermal comfort concept. This feature aims to enhance thermal comfort and promote human productivity by ensuring that a substantial majority of building users (above 80%) perceive their environment as thermally acceptable. The maximum points are three, and there are achieved by following parts:

- Part 1: Enhanced thermal environment. This is achieved by meeting specific standards (1 point);
- Part 2: Achieve thermal comfort. A post-occupancy survey should be administered at least twice a year to check whether regular occupants are satisfied with the thermal performance or not.

== POE at any stage after building occupancy ==
The term "post occupancy" can be confusing and simply refers to an occupied building rather than a vacant one. Furthermore, POEs may be conducted at regular intervals to monitor how the building facilities and its operation are currently supporting the occupants. A pre-project POE may be used to:

- Document ways in which stakeholders experience buildings
- To inform the briefing and design process for proposed buildings and building alterations
- To negotiate and resolve new building features and qualities, which compromise productivity and well-being
- Measure a dimension of project success
- feedback and feed-forward
- Set a baseline for measurement
- Establish benchmark data
- Input to the change management programme and to align change management and design
- Highlight where future investments may be best placed, and best avoided

A POE is often carried out six to twelve months after construction work is complete and buildings are occupied. Post Occupancy Evaluations are also undertaken at any time buildings' "lives"; particularly to understand stakeholders' experience of them, for briefing alterations and changes.

== Any built environment accommodating people ==
POE's have been conducted of facilities for schools, universities, technical institutes, kindergartens, museums, offices, courts, corrections, military, hospitals, landscape/civil works, learning environments, libraries, jails, police stations, housing, health centres and zoos. It would be equally possible to apply POE techniques to ships and "virtual" environments. POE has been applied to selected parts of buildings, aspects of buildings and groups of buildings on the same campus and several sites.

== Independent evaluation ==
POE is usually carried out by architects or building professionals with a social science or workplace consulting background. POE by independent consultants can offer an impartial evaluation.

== Other building studies ==
POE can be informed by reference to other building studies and POEs sometimes recommend other studies such as:

- Energy audit
- Survey (human research)
- Post Implementation Review
- Proprietary building rating schemes
- Noise measurements
- Indoor Air Quality measurements
- Benefits realisation management
- Building (maintenance) inspection
- Life-cycle assessment
- Valuation
- Environmental rating schemes (BREEAM, Green Star, LEED)

== Relevant Organisations ==
POE has been developed and discussed within these organisations:

- International Association for People-Environment Studies
- Environment Design Research Association
- Center for the Built Environment
