= Healing environments =

Healing environment, for healthcare buildings describes a physical setting and organizational culture that supports patients and families through the stresses imposed by illness, hospitalization, medical visits, the process of healing, and sometimes, bereavement. The concept implies that the physical healthcare environment can make a difference in how quickly the patient recovers from or adapts to specific acute and chronic conditions.

== Background ==
The original concept of the healing environment was developed by Florence Nightingale whose theory of nursing called for nurses to manipulate the environment to be therapeutic (Nightingale, F. 1859). Nightingale outlined in detail the requirements of the "sick room" to minimize suffering and optimize the capacity of a patient to recover, including quiet, warmth, clean air, light, and good diet. Early healthcare design followed her theories outlined in her treatise, "Notes on Hospitals". Following the discoveries by Louis Pasteur and others which lead to the Germ Theory, plus other technologies, the role of the environment was dominated by infection control and technological advances.

Starting in the 1960s, healing environments have been linked with evidence-based design (EBD), giving the concept a strong scientific base. While in some respects it can be said that the concept of healing environments has evolved into EBD, it's mainly in the area of reduction of stress that this overlap occurs; as EBD goes beyond the healing environments dimension to consider the effect of the built environment on patient clinical outcomes in the areas of staff stress and fatigue, patient stress, and facility operational efficiency and productivity to improve quality and patient safety. A 1984 study by Roger Ulrich found that surgical patients with a view of nature suffered fewer complications, used less pain medication and were discharged sooner than those who looked out on a brick wall. Since then, many studies have followed, showing the impact of several environmental factors on several health outcomes.

Today, the philosophy that guides the concept of the healing environment is rooted in research in the neurosciences, environmental psychology, psychoneuroimmunology, and evolutionary biology. The common thread linking these bodies of research is the physiological effects of stress on the individual and the ability to heal. Psychologically supportive environments enable patients and families to cope with and transcend illness.

== Goal ==
The goal of creating a healing environment is to reduce stress, and thereby reduce associated problems such as medical error, inability to concentrate, and physical symptoms of stress that can affect logical thought process. While use of EBD techniques would not necessarily make an environment a healing one, through EBD we can define environmental factors that can help to ease stress and thereby result in a healing environment. Malkin emphasizes the contribution of research to concepts that can create a healing environment, but just the inclusion do not make setting a 'healing environment'. The design team needs to translate the EBD into design solutions unique to the individual hospital.

According to "The Business Case for Creating a Healing Environment" written by Jain Malkin, the physical setting has the potential to be therapeutic if it achieves the following:

- eliminates environmental stressors such as noise, glare, lack of privacy and poor air quality;
- connects patients to nature with views to the outdoors, interior gardens, aquariums, water elements, etc.;
- offers options and choices to enhance feelings of being in control - these may include privacy versus socialization, lighting levels, type of music, seating options, quiet versus 'active' waiting areas;
- provides opportunities for social support - seating arrangements that provide privacy for family groupings, accommodation for family members or friends in treatment setting; sleep-over accommodation in patient rooms;
- provides positive distractions such as interactive art, fireplaces, aquariums, Internet connection, music, access to special video programmes with soothing images of nature accompanied by music developed specifically for the healthcare setting; and
- engenders feelings of peace, hope, reflection and spiritual connection and provides opportunities for relaxation, education, humour and whimsy.

== Importance of lighting and sound ==
=== Lighting ===
Eighty percent of what we interpret of our surroundings comes to us from what we see of our environment and that is greatly affected by the light available in that environment. Lighting design in healthcare environments is a major factor in creating healing situations. Since the design of healthcare environments is said to influence patient outcomes, yet high costs may prove a barrier to major renovations, changes in lighting becomes a cost-effective way to improve existing facilities. It is proven that people who are surrounded by natural light are more productive and live healthier lives. In care environments, medical equipment, white walls, and lack of familiar visual stimuli may act as additional stressors for patients. For this reason principles of a healing environment emphasizes the importance of natural lighting and windows in patient spaces.

=== The auditory environment ===
While so much of the patient's experience is based on visual cues, the majority of meaning of their experience is auditory. The many sounds of a hospital are foreign to their experience and their line of sight is limited. Nightingale claimed that sounds that create "anticipation, expectation, waiting, and fear of surprise ... damage the patient.". Add to the perception and meaning attribute to any sound the factors of age-related hearing impairment common to older patients, heavy medication, pain, and other conditions, cognition is impacted as is the ability to understand language. Hospital noise, at any volume level, is credited with being the primary cause of sleep deprivation, a contributing factor in delirium, and a risk factor for errors. The current pressure to reduce noise at night has been mistakenly understood to mean undue quiet at night when patients most need cues that people are around them and available if they need help. Just s lighting must be designed to serve both day and night, so much the auditory environment be designed to support activity, cognition, rest, and sleep.

Adding to the above, patients need positive visual and auditory stimulation. Nightingale called for variety, color, and form as a means of arousing creativity and health in patients. Currently, using appropriate art, nature imagery and music are found to improve the experience of the patient. Technologies have afforded patients infinite options to use media as the choose. The addition of beauty must also be accompanied by an attention to orderliness: removal of clutter, trash, and other distractions.

== See also ==
- Ecopsychology
- Environmental psychology
- Healthy building
- Interior design psychology
- Mental environment
