= Evidence-based design =

Constructing a physical environment based on scientific research

Evidence-based design (EBD) is the process of constructing a building or physical environment based on scientific research to achieve the best possible outcomes. Evidence-based design is especially important in evidence-based medicine, where research has shown that environment design can affect patient outcomes. It is also used in architecture, interior design, landscape architecture, facilities management, education, and urban planning. Evidence-based design is part of the larger movement towards evidence-based practices.

== Background ==
Evidence-based design (EBD) was popularized by the seminal study by Ulrich (1984) that showed the impact of a window view on patient recovery. Studies have since examined the relationships between design of the physical environment of hospitals with outcomes in health, the results of which show how the physical environment can lower the incidence of nosocomial infections, medical errors, patient falls, and staff injuries; and reduce stress of facility users, improve safety and productivity, reduce resource waste, and enhance sustainability.

Evidence in EBD may include a wide range of sources of knowledge, from systematic literature reviews to practice guidelines and expert opinions. Evidence-based design was first defined as "the deliberate attempt to base design decisions on the best available research evidence" and that "an evidence-based designer, together with an informed client, makes decisions based on the best available information from research and project evaluations". The Center for Heath Design (CHD), a non-profit organization that supports healthcare and design professionals to improve the understanding and application of design that influence the performance of healthcare, patient satisfaction, staff productivity and safety, base their model on the importance of working in partnership with the client and interdisciplinary team to foster understanding of the client, preferences and resources.

The roots of evidence-based design could go back to 1860 when Florence Nightingale identified fresh air as "the very first canon of nursing," and emphasized the importance of quiet, proper lighting, warmth and clean water. Nightingale applied statistics to nursing, notably with "Diagram of the causes of mortality in the army in the East". This statistical study led to advances in sanitation, although the germ theory of disease was not yet fully accepted.

Nightingale was also an enthusiast for the therapeutic benefits of sunlight and views from windows. She wrote: "Second only to fresh air … I should be inclined to rank light in importance for the sick. Direct sunlight, not only daylight, is necessary for speedy recovery … I mention from experience, as quite perceptible in promoting recovery, the being able to see out of a window, instead of looking against a dead wall; the bright colours of flowers; the being able to read in bed by the light of the window close to the bed-head. It is generally said the effect is upon the mind. Perhaps so, but it is not less so upon the body on that account ...."

Nightingale's ideas appear to have been influential on E R Robson, architect to the London School Board, when he wrote: “It is well known that the rays of the sun have a beneficial influence on the air of a room, tending to promote ventilation, and that they are to a young child very much what they are to a flower.”

The evidence-based design movement began in the 1970s with Archie Cochranes's book Effectiveness and Efficiency: Random Reflections on Health Services. to collect, codify, and disseminate "evidence" gathered in randomised controlled trials relative to the built environment. A 1984 study by Roger Ulrich seemed to support Nightingale's ideas from more than a century before: he found that surgical patients with a view of nature suffered fewer complications, used less pain medication and were discharged sooner than those who looked out on a brick wall; and laid the foundation for what has now become a discipline known as evidence-based design. Studies exist about the psychological effects of lighting, carpeting and noise on critical-care patients, and evidence links physical environment with improvement of patients and staff safety, wellness and satisfaction. Architectural researchers have studied the impact of hospital layout on staff effectiveness, and social scientists studied guidance and wayfinding. In the 1960s and 1970s numerous studies were carried out using methods drawn from behavioural psychology to examine both people's behaviour in relation to buildings and their responses to different designs – see for example the book by David Canter and Terence Lee More recently, architectural researchers have conducted post-occupancy evaluations (POE) to provide advice on improving building design and quality. While the EBD process is particularly suited to healthcare, it may be also used in other fields for positive health outcomes and provision of healing environments.

While healthcare proved to be one of the most prominent sectors to examine the evidence base for how good design benefits building occupants, visitors and the public, other sectors also have considerable bodies of evidence. And, many sectors benefit from literature reviews that draw together and summarise the evidence. In the UK some were led by the UK Commission for Architecture and the Built Environment, a government watchdog established by the Labour Party following its election in 1997 and commitment to improving the quality of the UK stock of public sector buildings. Other reviews were supported by various public or private organisations, and some were undertaken in academia. Reviews were undertaken at the urban scale, some were cross-sectoral and others were sector based (hospitals, schools, higher education). An academic paper by Sebastian Macmillan) gives an overview of the field as it was in 2006.

== A cautionary note about the strength of evidence in the built environment ==
In supporting evidence-based design, some caution is needed to ascertain the robustness of the evidence: the architectural psychology movement eventually drew criticism for its tendency towards ‘architectural determinism’ – a confusion between correlation and causality with the implication that there were mechanistic and causal links between the built environment and human behaviour. As some of the studies reviewed below reveal, the evidence is often weak or, worse, conflicting. In an early review of evidence in the healthcare sector, Rubin, Owens & Golden examined the medical literature for research papers on the effect of the physical environment on patient outcomes. They concluded that, if the demanding standards of proof used in medical research were used, almost all the studies would have to be regarded as methodologically flawed or at least limited. Unfortunately strongly held opinions are not the same as rigorously collected evidence.

== Evidence-base for architecture generally, housing and urban environments ==
In 2002, CABE published a cross-sectoral study that set a pattern by reviewing a selection of the evidence (which it called the key research) for healthcare buildings, educational buildings, housing, urban environments, and business premises. It claimed: “Good design is not just about the aesthetic improvement of our environment, it is as much about improved quality of life, equality of opportunity and economic growth. … Good design does not cost more when measured across the lifetime of the building or place …”

At the urban scale, in 2001, CABE and DETR published a study on the value of urban design which includes a literature review plus some case studies.

In New Zealand, a landmark review was supported by the Ministry for the Environment. The study categorised the evidence as conclusive, strong, suggestive or anecdotal, and also noted the difficulty of establishing causation since various design elements may be found in combination with other features. The authors state that urban design is context-specific and cautions against automatically adopting what works elsewhere in New Zealand.

In its 2003 review of the evidence about housing CABE expressed similar concerns about the evidence base when it said: “The most striking finding in a review of the literature relating to the quality of residential design is the almost complete absence of any empirical attempts to measure the implications of high quality on costs, prices or values.”

David Halpern's book brings together and reviews a substantial number of studies covering among other issues: mental ill-health in city centres; social isolation in out of town housing estates; residential satisfaction; and estate layouts, semi-private spaces and a sense of community. He concludes that there is substantial evidence to show the physical environment has real and significant effects on group and friendship formation, and on patterns of neighbourly behaviour.

Other literature reviews include a 2006 study by the Scottish Executive and one by the UK NWDA/RENEW North West.

== Public open space ==
CABE's 2004 literature review on public open space draws attention to the physical and mental health benefits associated with access to recreational space, as well as the environmental value of biodiversity and improved air quality. In a follow up 2005 study entitled Does Money Grown on Trees? CABE assessed the impact on the value of residential property of proximity to a park, drawing on valuations prepared by local property experts in which external variables (shops, schools, busy roads) were controlled for. Economic and non-monetary benefits from the proximity were identified.

== Schools and Higher Education ==
A comprehensive review of the literature was undertaken in 2005 for the Design Council. It concluded that there was evidence for the effect of basic physical variables (air quality, temperature, noise) on learning but that once minimum standards were achieved, further improvements were less significant. The reviewers found forceful opinions on the effects of lighting and colour but that the supporting evidence was conflicting. It was difficult to draw generalizable conclusions about other physical characteristics, and the interactions between different elements was as important as single elements.

Other literature reviews of the education sector include two by Price Waterhouse Coopers and one by researchers at the University of Salford.

In the higher education sector, a review by CABE reports on the links between building design and the recruitment, retention and performance of staff and students. Fifty articles are reviewed, and five new case studies reported.

== Offices ==
The offices sector has been widely studied with the major concerns focusing on productivity. A study in 2000 by Sheffield Hallam University reported that apart from surveys of occupants of individual offices, the evidence base on new workplaces was mainly journalistic and biased towards interviews with successes and failures. Some companies claimed that new spatial arrangements led to reduced costs, reduced absenteeism and easier recruitment, faster development of new ideas, and increased profitability. But others reported the exact opposite; and the reasons for this remained unclear.

CABE and the British Council for Offices published a joint study in 2005. The paper reports that four main issues have been studied: the largest is environmental and ergonomic issues related to the comfort of individual office workers; secondly research on the efficiency with which office space is used; thirdly adaptability and flexibility and finally research related to supporting work processes. The report is critical of the disproportionate focus on the performance of building services compared with other aspects of buildings.

== Evidence-based design for healthcare facilities ==
There is a growing awareness among healthcare professionals and medical planners for the need to create patient-centered environments that can help patients and family cope with the stress that accompanies illness. There is also growing supporting research and evidence through various studies that have shown both the influence of well-designed environments on positive patient health outcomes, and poor design on negative effects including longer hospital stays.

Using biophilic design concepts in interior environments is increasingly argued to have positive impacts on health and well-being through improving direct and indirect experiences of nature. Numerous studies have demonstrated improved patient health outcomes through environmental measures; exposing patients to nature has been shown to produce substantial alleviation of pain, and limited research also suggests that patients experience less pain when exposed to higher levels of daylight in their hospital rooms. Patients have an increased need for sleep during illness, but suffer from poor sleep when hospitalised. Approaches such as single-bed rooms and reduced noise have been shown to improve patient sleep. Natural daylight in patient rooms help to maintain circadian rhythms and improve sleep.

According to Heerwagen, an environmental psychologist, medical models of health integrate behavioral, social, psychological, and mental processes. Contact with nature and daylight has been found to enhance emotional functioning; drawing on research from studies (EBD) on well-being outcomes and building features. Positive feelings such as calmness increase, while anxiety, anger, or other negative emotions diminish with views of nature. In contrast there is also convincing evidence that stress could be worsened and ineffective in fostering restoration in built environments that lack nature.

Few studies have shown the restorative effects of gardens for stressed patients, families and staff. Behavioural observation and interview methods in post occupancy studies of hospital gardens have shown a faster recovery from stress by nearly all garden users. Limited evidence suggest increased benefits when these gardens contain foliage, flowers, water, pleasant nature sounds, such as birds and water.

== Related approaches ==
=== Performance-based building design ===
EBD is closely related to performance-based building design (PBBD) practices. As an approach to design, PBBD tries to create clear statistical relationships between design decisions and satisfaction levels demonstrated by the building systems. Like EBD, PBBD uses research evidence to predict performance related to design decisions.

The decision-making process is non-linear, since the building environment is a complex system. Choices cannot be based on cause-and-effect predictions; instead, they depend on variable components and mutual relationships. Technical systems, such as heating, ventilation and air-conditioning, have interrelated design choices and related performance requirements (such as energy use, comfort and use cycles) are variable components.

=== Evidence-based medicine ===
Evidence-based medicine (EBM) is a systematic process of evaluating scientific research which is used as the basis for clinical treatment choices. Sackett, Rosenberg, Gray, Haynes and Richardson argue that "evidence-based medicine is the conscientious, explicit and judicious use of current best evidence in making decisions about the care of individual patients". It is used in the healthcare industry to convince decision-makers to invest the time and money to build better buildings, realizing strategic business advantages as a result. As medicine has become increasingly evidence-based, healthcare design uses EBD to link hospitals' physical environments with healthcare outcomes.

=== Research-informed design ===
Research-informed design (RID) is a less-developed concept that is commonly misunderstood and used synonymously with EBD, although they are different. It can be defined as the process of applying credible research in integration with the project team to inform the environmental design to achieve the project goals. Credible research here, includes qualitative, quantitative, and mixed methods approaches with the highest standards of rigor suitable for their methodology.

The literature for "research-informed" practices comes from education, and not from the healthcare disciplines. The process involves application of the outcomes from literature review and empirical investigation to inform design during the design phase, given the constraints; and to share the process and the lessons learnt just like in EDB.

== Research and accreditation ==
As EBD is supported by research, many healthcare organizations are adopting its principles with the guidance of evidence-based designers. The Center for Health Design developed the Pebble Project, a joint research effort by CHD and selected healthcare providers on the effect of building environments on patients and staff. Health Environment Research & Design journal and the Health Care Advisory Board are additional sources of information and database on EBD.

The Evidence Based Design Accreditation and Certification (EDAC) program was introduced in 2009 by The Center for Health Design to provide internationally recognized certification and promote the use of EBD in healthcare building projects, making EBD an accepted and credible approach to improving healthcare outcomes. EDAC identifies those experienced in EBD and teaches about the research process: identifying, hypothesizing, implementing, gathering and reporting data associated with a healthcare project.

== Process ==
There are four components to evidence-based design:

- Gather qualitative and quantitative intelligence
- Map strategic, cultural and research goals
- Hypothesize outcomes, innovate, and implement translational design
- Measure and share outcomes

=== Meta-analysis template for literature review ===
In his book Evidence-based Policy: A Realistic Perspective, Ray Pawson suggests a meta-analysis template which may be applied to EBD. With this protocol, the field will be able to provide designers with a source for evidence-based design.

A systematic review process should follow five steps:

1. Formulating the review question
2. Identifying and collecting evidence
3. Evaluating the quality of the evidence
4. Extracting, processing and systematizing data
5. Disseminating findings

=== Conceptual model ===
According to Hamilton, architects have a responsibility in translation of research in the field, and its application in informing designs. He further illustrates a conceptual model architects could use, that identifies four levels of addressing research and methods base on varying levels of commitment:

- Level 1
  - Informed design decisions based on available literature on environmental research, based on applicability, such as the use of a state of the art technology or strategy based on the physical setting of the project
- Level 2
  - Design decisions based on predictive performance and measurable outcomes, rather than subjective decisions based on random choice
- Level 3
  - Results reported publicly, with the objective of moving information on the methods and results moving information beyond the design team,
  - The peer review, makes the process more robust, as it could include varying perspectives from those who may or may not agree with the findings
- Level 4
  - Publishing findings in peer-reviewed journals
  - Collaborating with academic and social scientists

=== Working model ===
A white paper (series 3/5) from the Center for Health Design presents a working model to help designers implement EBD decision-making. The primary goal is providing a healing environment; positive outcomes depend on three investments:

- Designed infrastructure, including the built environment and technology
- Re-engineered clinical and administrative practices to maximize infrastructure investment
- Leadership to maximize human and infrastructure investments

All three investments depend on existing research.

=== Strategies ===
A white paper from the Center for Health Design identifies ten strategies to aid EBD decision-making:

1. Start with problems. Identify the problems the project is trying to solve and for which the facility design plays an important role (for example, adding or upgrading technology, expanding services to meet growing market demand, replacing aging infrastructure)
2. Use an integrated multidisciplinary approach with consistent senior involvement, ensuring that everyone with problem-solving tools is included. It is essential to stimulate synergy between different community to maximize efforts, outcomes and interchanges.
3. Maintain a patient- and family-centered approach; patient and family experiences are key to defining aims and assessing outcomes.
4. Focus on financial operations past the first-cost impact, exploring the cost-effectiveness of design options over time and considering multi-year investment returns.
5. Apply disciplined participation and criteria management. These processes use decision-making tools such as SWOT analysis, analytic hierarchy processes and decision trees which may also be used in design (particularly of technical aspects such as structure, fire safety or energy use).
6. Establish incentive-linked criteria to increase design-team motivation and involve end users with checklists, surveys and simulations.
7. Use strategic partnerships to create new products with hospital-staff expertise and influence.
8. Encourage simulation and testing, assuming the patient's perspective when making lighting and energy models and computer visualizations.
9. Use a lifecycle perspective (30–50 years) from planning to product, exploring the lifecycle return on investment of design strategies for safety and workforce outcomes.
10. Overcommunicate. Positive outcomes are connected with the involvement of clinical staff and community members with meetings, newsletters, webcams and other tools.

== Tools ==
Evidence-based design has been applied to efficacy measurements of a building's design, and is usually done at the post-construction stage as a part of a post-occupancy evaluation (POE). The POE assesses strengths and weaknesses of design decisions in relation to human behaviour in a built environment. Issues include acoustics, odor control, vibration, lighting and user-friendliness, and are binary-choice (acceptable or unacceptable). Other research techniques, such as observation, photography, checklists, interviews, surveys and focus groups, supplement traditional design-research methods. Assessment tools have been developed by The Center for Health Design and the Picker Institute to help healthcare managers and designers gather information on consumer needs, assess their satisfaction and measure quality improvements:

- The Patient Environmental Checklist assesses an existing facility's strong and weak points. Specific environmental features are evaluated by patients and their families on a 5-point scale, and the checklist quickly identifies areas needing improvement.
- The Patient Survey gathers information on patients' experiences with the built environment. The questions range is wide, since patients' priorities may differ significantly from those of administrators or designers.
- Focus Groups with consumers learn about specific needs and generate ideas for future solutions.
