= Mental environment =

Societal influences on mental health

The mental environment refers to the sum of all societal influences upon mental health.

The term is often used in a context critical of the mental environment in industrialized societies. It is argued that just as industrial societies produce physical toxins and pollutants which harm humans physical health, they also produce psychological toxins (e.g. television, excessive noise, violent marketing tactics, Internet addiction, social media) that cause psychological damage.

This poor mental environment may help explain why rates of mental illness are reportedly higher in industrial societies which might also have its roots in poor educational environment and mechanical routinised life present. Magico-religious beliefs are an important contribution of such communal settings. Delusions such as these rooted from childhood are often hard to completely regulate from a person's life.

The idea has its roots in evolutionary psychology, as the deleterious consequences of a poor mental environment can be explained by the mismatch between the mental environment humans evolved to exist within and the one they exist within today.

"We live in both a mental and physical environment. We can influence the mental environment around us, but to a far greater extent we are influenced by the mental environment. The mental environment contains forces that affect our thinking and emotions and that can dominate our personal minds." - Marshall Vian Summers

== See also ==
- Brain health and pollution
- Effects of climate change on mental health
- Environmental psychology
- Healthy building
- Horticultural therapy
- Right to a healthy environment
- Socioeconomic status and mental health
- Therapeutic garden
