= International Association of People-Environment Studies =

The International Association of People-Environment Studies (IAPS), has been promoting the interdisciplinary exchange of ideas between planning and social scientists for 35 years – above all between spatial planning, architecture, psychology, and sociology. IAPS was officially founded in 1981, although its origins can be traced back to a series of successful conferences in several European countries from 1969 to 1979.

The objectives of IAPS are:

- To facilitate communication among those concerned with the relationships between people and their physical environment
- To stimulate research and innovation for improving human well-being and the physical environment
- To promote the integration of research, education, policy and practice

People-environment studies, originating from environmental psychology (Lewin, Barker, Brunswik), have always tried to close the "mind gaps" between natural sciences, engineering, arts, and social sciences by an epistemological approach that encompasses denotations (objects and techniques) as well as connotations (subjective social, cultural meanings).

== Membership ==
Benefits of membership include:

- The right to vote and stand for membership of the Board
- Reduced fees for attending conferences and seminars
- Free copies of the IAPS newsletter. This contains research summaries, articles, reviews, letters, lists of references, and general news of the research field
- The right to be listed in and receive a copy of the Directory of IAPS members
- Reduced subscription rates for specified journals

== List of conferences ==
The biannual conference is the main event organised under auspices of the association. In the past years, the following conferences have been organised:

Place, Country	Year	Conference	Theme
Dalandhui, UK	1969	AP1	Architectural Psychology
Kingston, UK	1970	AP2	Architectural Psychology
Lund, Sweden	1973	AP3	Architectural Psychology
Surrey, UK	1973	AP4	Psychology and the Built Environment
Sheffield, UK	1975	AP5	Architectural Psychology
Strasbourg, France	1976	AP6	Space Appropriation
Louvain La Neuve, Belgium	1979	IAPC 7	Conflicting Experiences of Space
Surrey, UK	1979	IAPC 7	Conflict and Narcissism
Barcelona, Spain	1982	IAPS 7	Home-Environment. Man-Environment: Qualitative Aspects
Berlin, Germany	1984	IAPS 8	Perspectives on Environment and Action
Haifa, Israel	1986	IAPS 9	Environments in Transition
Delft, Netherlands	1988	IAPS 10	Looking Back to the Future
Ankara, Turkey	1990	IAPS 11	Culture-Space-History
Halkidiki, Greece	1992	IAPS 12	Socio-environmental Metamorphoses
Manchester, UK	1994	IAPS 13	The Urban Experiences
Stockholm, Sweden	1996	IAPS 14	Evolving Environmental Ideals – Ways of Life, Values, Design Practices
Eindhoven, Netherlands	1998	IAPS 15	Shifting Balances – Changing Roles In Policy, Research and Design
Paris, France	2000	IAPS 16	Metropolis: Cities, Social Life and Sustainable Development
A Coruña, Spain	2002	IAPS 17	Culture, Quality of Life and Globalization – Problems and Challenges for the New Millennium
Vienna, Austria	2004	IAPS 18	Evaluation in Progress – Strategies for Environmental Research and Implementation
Alexandria, Egypt	2006	IAPS 19	Environment, Health and Sustainable Development
Rome, Italy	2008	IAPS 20	Urban diversities, Biosphere and Well-being
Leipzig, Germany	2010	IAPS 21	Vulnerability, Risk and Complexity: Impacts of global Change on Human Habitats
Glasgow, UK	2012	IAPS 22	Human experience in the natural and built environment: implications for research, policy and practice
Timișoara, Romania	2014	IAPS 23	Transitions to sustainable societies: Designing research and policies for changing lifestyles and communities
Lund, Sweden	2016	IAPS 24	The human being at home, work and leisure. Sustainable use and development of indoor and outdoor spaces in late modern everyday life

== Post conference publications ==
- People, Places, and Sustainability (2002) Editors: Moser, G. / Pol, E. / Bernard, Y. / Bonnes, M. / Corraliza, J.A. / Giuliani, V.
- Culture, Quality of Life and Globalization – Problems and Challenges for the New Millennium (2003) Editors: García Mira, R. / Sabucedo Cameselle, J.M. / Martínez, J.R.
- Designing Social Innovation - Planning, Building, Evaluating (2005) Editors: Martens, B. / Keul, A.G.
- Environment, Health, and Sustainable Development (2010) Editors: Abdel-Hadi, A. / Tolba, M.K. / Soliman, S.

== IAPS Digital Library ==
A database of all 4,400 abstracts from conferences since 1969, which permits a full-text search through the history of environmental psychology.

== Notable people ==
- Perla Serfaty, inducted into the IAPS Hall of Fame in 2018
