= Creative brief =

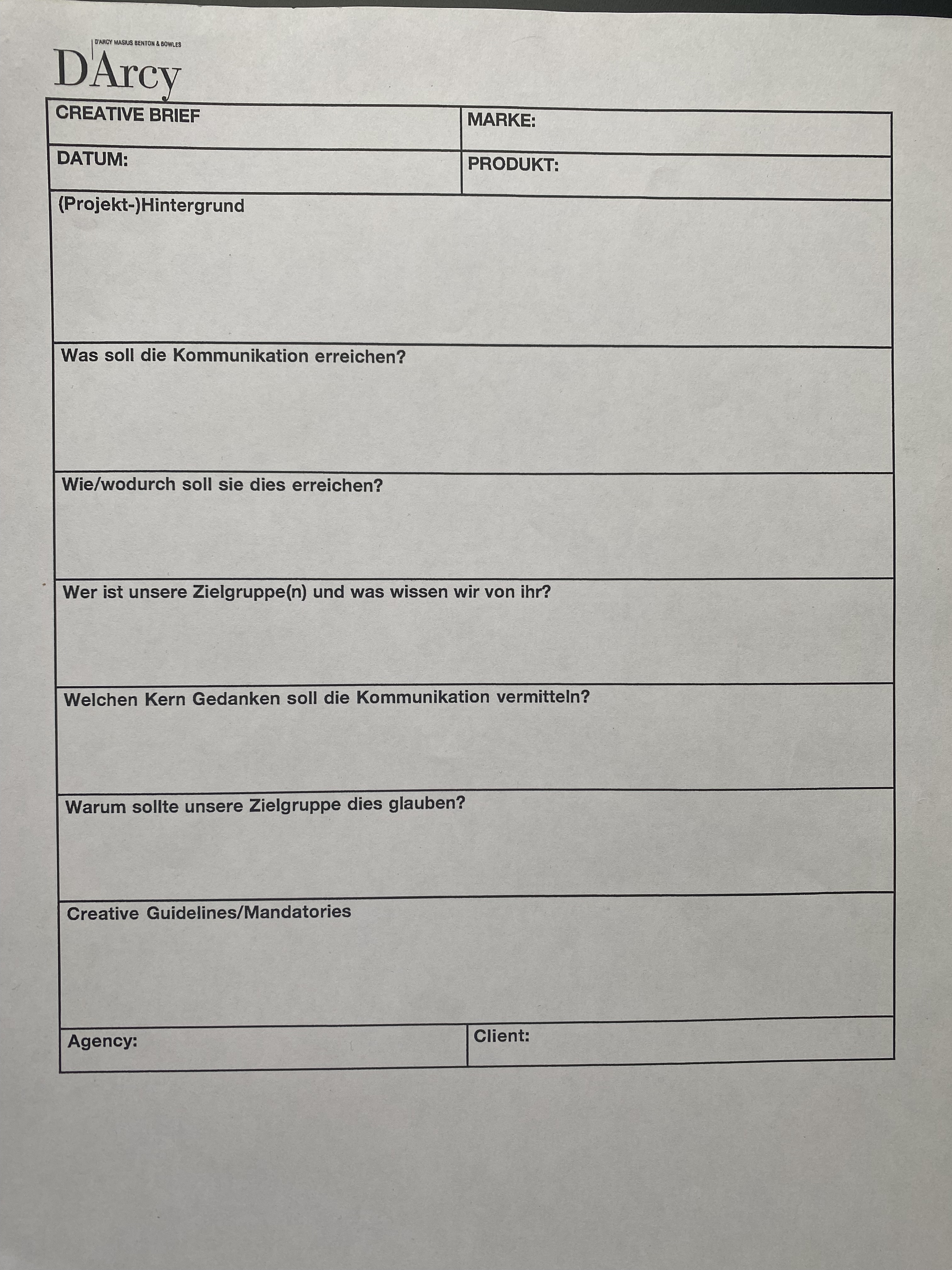
Creative brief in German

A creative brief is a document used by creative professionals and agencies to develop creative deliverables, such as visual design, copy, advertising, and websites. The document is usually developed by the requestor (typically by a marketing team member) and approved by the creative team, including designers, writers, and project managers. In some cases, the project's creative brief may require creative director approval before work could commence.

== Description ==
In advertising, creative briefs are written after the client briefs the agency (client brief). After receiving the client brief, the account manager is responsible to sort the data out to come up with a creative brief (may be in collaboration with creative director).

The creative brief, consisting of a series of simple questions asked by the creative team and answered by the requestor, becomes the template for the creative execution. As the creative develops, there may be potential for it to move off track. If this happens, team members can refer back to this mutually agreed upon document to see where the divergence began. Within an advertising agency environment, it is typically the responsibility of the account manager to ensure that the creative execution is "on-brief". :

Creative briefs can come in many flavors and are usually tailored to the agency or group that is developing the creative deliverable. They know which questions (and answers) are of paramount importance to them in order to deliver a high-quality creative execution.

In the past, creative briefs were redacted and included graphics, charts, newspapers scraps or illustrations and photos. With the arrival of computers, more and more agencies moved to digital briefs, using text editors, presentation software and digital design tools to design and produce the briefs. Collaborative software made it possible for creative teams to collaborate with their clients and other specialists involved in the brief online.

The precise nature of a creative brief varies from company to company, however a typical creative brief may contain:

- Background — what is the background of the project? Why is it being done?
- Target audience — what do they already think about this subject? Is there anything that should be avoided?
- Profile of the typical user or consumer
- Key insight - what has been learned about the market's attitude to the company, brand or product
- Objectives — what is to be accomplished? How will this be measured and success understood?
- Single message — what is the one thing to tell the audience? What is the single thing they should remember about the offering? How will they believe what we say?
- Desired customer behavior? (e.g., trial, purchase, recommend)
- Tone of voice (e.g. serious, light-hearted, humorous)
- Mandatories (mandatory elements) — mandatory elements such as the client's logo, address, phone number and so forth.
- Deliverables — what is to be used to give the audience the message? What is the best way or place to reach this audience?
- Timeline — how soon is this needed? When is it expected to be done? How many rounds (revisions) will this project undergo?
- Budget — how much can be spent to get this developed? Is there any budget needed to publish/flight the creative?
- Approvals — who needs to give the "okay"?

A creative brief must be directional and inspirational. Directional elements refer to marketing elements (target market, objectives, message, etc.) and inspirational elements refer to tone of voice, feeling of the advertisement.

== See also ==
- Advertising
- Advertising management
- Design brief
- Marketing communications
