= Healthy building =

Building that promotes health and well-being

Healthy building refers to an emerging area of interest that supports the physical, psychological, and social health and well-being of people in buildings and the built environment. Buildings can be key promoters of health and well-being since most people spend a majority of their time indoors. According to the National Human Activity Pattern Survey, Americans spend "an average of 87% of their time in enclosed buildings and about 6% of their time in enclosed vehicles."

Healthy building can be seen as the next generation of green building that not only includes environmentally responsible and resource-efficient building concepts, but also integrates human well-being and performance. These benefits can include "reducing absenteeism and presenteeism, lowering health care costs, and improving individual and organizational performance."

== Integrated design ==
Healthy building involves many different concepts, fields of interest, and disciplines. 9 Foundations describes healthy building as an approach built on building science, health science, and building science. An integrated design team can consist of stakeholders and specialists such as facility managers, architects, building engineers, health and wellness experts, and public health partners. Conducting charrettes with an integrated design team can foster collaboration and help the team develop goals, plans, and solutions.

== Buildings and health components ==
There are many different components that can support health and well-being in buildings.

=== Indoor air quality ===
Spengler considers indoor air quality as an important determinant of healthy design. Buildings with poor indoor air quality can contribute to chronic lung diseases such as asthma, asbestosis and lung cancer. Chemical emissions can be outgassed by building materials, furnishings, and supplies. Air fresheners, cleaning products, paints, printing, flooring, and wax and polish products can also be a source of volatile organic compounds (VOCs) and semi-volatile compound (SVOCs). The LEED v4 Handbook posits that indoor air quality is "one of the most pivotal factors in maintaining building occupants' safety, productivity, and well-being."

==== Ventilation ====
Higher rates of ventilation affect indoor pollutants, odors, and the perceived freshness of air by diluting contaminants in the air. ASHRAE's Standard 55-2017 has minimum standards of 8.3 L/s/person. In one study, raising the rate to 15 L/s/person increased performance by 1.1% and decreased sick building symptoms by 18.8%. Whole Building Design Guide recommends separating ventilation from thermal conditioning so as to increase comfort.

Natural ventilation is discouraged in buildings that have strict filtration requirements, contaminant dilution concerns, special pressure relationships, speech privacy concerns, and internal heat load demands. The San Joaquin ASHRAE chapter recommends assessing the outside air quality and configuration of the facade and building before demonstrating compliance and control of natural ventilation. ASHRAE Standard 55-2017 section 6.4 requires the natural ventilation be "manually controlled or controlled through the use of electrical or mechanical actuators under direct occupant control." Chris Schaffner, CEO of the Green Engineer, describes operable windows as the "HVAC engineer's ultimate safety factor." Spengler and Chen recommend natural ventilation being used wherever possible.

==== Dust and pests ====
Dust and dirt can be a source of exposure to VOC and lead as well as pesticides and allergens. High efficiency filter vacuums can remove particles such as dander and allergens that otherwise result in breathing issues. A study of asthmatic children in inner city urban communities suggests they became sensitive to the presence of cockroaches, mice, or rats due to their presence in their homes.

==== The use of disposable material ====
The US culture relies heavily on disposable products, especially within healthcare, to minimize on cost and time. In hospitals, for example, healthcare providers cut on costs associated with sterilizing equipment between patient cares by using ready-to-use disposable trays. However, this may at a cost to the environment; in one study, disposable cotton towels were suspected to have an adverse environmental impact. It is estimated that cotton production requires 6.6 kg of carbon dioxide equivalents and 0.024 kg of nitrogen emissions, in addition to a substantial amount of water, fertilizer and work. Healthcare managers are urged to request transparency of medical product production (and waste management) lines to provide assurance that products used have zero or minimal impacts on human health and our environment.

===== Thermal comfort =====
Thermal comfort is influenced by factors like air temperature, mean radiant temperature, relative humidity, air speed, metabolic rate, and clothing. Thermal conditions can affect learning, cognitive performance, task completion, disease transmission, and sleep. ASHRAE defines an acceptable thermal environment as one that 80% of occupants find acceptable, though individual occupant thermal control results in higher satisfaction of occupants. Indoor spaces that are not air conditioned can create indoor heat waves if the outside air cools but the thermal mass of the building traps the hotter air inside. Cedeño-Laurent et al. believe these may become worse as climate change increases the "frequency, duration, and intensity of heat waves" and will be harder to adjust to in areas that are designed for colder climates.

===== Moisture and humidity =====
The Whole Building Design Guide recommends the indoor relative humidity to be between 30 and 50% to prevent unwanted moisture and to design for proper drainage and ventilation. Moisture is introduced into the building either by rainwater intrusion, outside humid air infiltration, internally generated moisture, and vapor diffusion through the building envelope. High temperatures, precipitation, and building age enable mold. It contributes to mold and poor indoor air quality. Vapor retarders have traditionally been used to prevent moisture in walls and roofs.

==== Noise ====
While noise is not always controllable, it has a high correlation and causation relationship with mental health, stress, and blood pressure. One study suggests that there is a higher correlation of noise irritation and bodily pain or discomfort in women. Effects of excessive noise pollution include hearing impairment, speech intelligibility, sleep disturbance, physiological functions, mental illness, and performance. The World Health Organization recommends creating a "National Plan for a Sustainable Noise Indoor Environment" specific to each country.

=== Water quality ===
Water quality can be contaminated by inorganic chemicals, organic chemicals, and microorganisms. The World Health Organization considers waterborne diseases to be one of the world's major health concerns, especially for developing countries and children. WHO recommends following water safety plans that include management, maintenance, good design, cleaning, temperature management, and preventing stagnation. Stagnant water is found to deteriorate the microbiological quality of water, and increase corrosion, odors, and taste issues. The bacterial pathogen Legionella may have a higher potential for growth in large buildings due to long water distribution systems and not enough maintenance.

Awareness of these issues is recommended by the WHO in order to maintain water quality:

- Backflow
- Cross connections
- External quality management
- Independent water supply
- Material use
- Minimization of dead ends and stagnation
- Seasonal use areas
- Storage tank integrity
- Water pressure
- Water temperature

=== Safety and security ===
Concerns of safety affect the mental and possibly physical health of residents by reducing the amount of physical activity. Fear of crime can result in less physical activity as well as increased social isolation. Atkinson posits that crime is based on motivated offenders, targets, and the absence of guardians. Adjusting these in buildings may increase presumed safety.

=== Lighting and view ===
The type and timing of light throughout the day affects circadian rhythms and human physiology. In a study done by Shamsul et al., cool white light and artificial daylight (approximately 450-480 nanometers) was associated with higher levels of alertness. Blue light positively affects mood, performance, fatigue, concentration, and eye comfort and enabled better sleep at night. Bright light during winter has also been shown to improve self-reported health and reduce distress.

Daylighting refers to providing access to natural daylight, which can be aesthetically pleasing and improve sleep duration and quality. The LEED handbook writes that daylighting can save energy while "increasing the quality of the visual environment" and occupant satisfaction.

Views to green landscapes can significantly increase attention and stress recovery. They can also have a positive influence on emotional states. Ko et al. consider views to be "important for the comfort, emotion, and working memory and concentration of occupants." Providing a view to nature through a glass window may benefit occupants' well-being and increase employee's effectiveness.

=== Site selection ===
Creating a walkable environment that connects people to workplaces, green spaces, public transportation, fitness centers, and other basic needs and services can influence daily physical activity as well as diet and type of commute. In particular, proximity to green spaces (e.g., parks, walking trails, gardens) or therapeutic landscapes can reduce absenteeism and improve well-being.

=== Foundations ===
Problems in foundations and underground conditions can have drastic impacts on the health of the building including structural issues such as cracking, humidity issues and indoor air quality and mould problems. These can arise from various factors. Different types of soil possess varying properties, and some can challenge foundation stability. Expansive soils like clay expand and shrink with moisture changes, causing foundation movement and settlement. Loose or poorly compacted soil can lead to uneven settling. Inadequate drainage around a building can lead to excessive soil moisture, exerting pressure on the foundation. This can result in movement, heaving, or settling. Large trees near a building can have extensive root systems that extract moisture from the soil, causing it to shrink and destabilize the foundation. Root growth can also apply pressure, leading to cracks or movement. Poor construction practices, including low-quality materials, inadequate reinforcement, or improper design, can compromise the foundation's structural integrity. Leaking or burst water pipes beneath the foundation can saturate the soil, destabilizing it and causing foundation movement or settlement. Earthquakes, floods, or storms can subject the foundation to extreme forces and vibrations, resulting in damage or shifting. Soil erosion due to heavy rainfall, landscaping issues, or improper grading can wash away supporting soil around the foundation, causing settlement or shifting. Extreme temperature fluctuations and freeze-thaw cycles can cause soil expansion and contraction, exerting pressure on the foundation and potentially leading to cracks or movement.

Especially the climatic effects are expected to worsen as climate change progresses. Addressing foundation issues promptly is crucial to mitigate these consequences and maintain the safety, value, and integrity of the building. Monitoring solutions include ground penetrating radar and electrical resistivity tomography. Protective measures include regular inspections and maintenance, good drainage and moisture control, appropriate ventilation and tending to trees and plants at the site.

=== Building design ===
There are many aspects of a building that can be designed to support positive health and well-being. For example, creating well-placed collaboration and social areas (e.g., break rooms, open collaboration areas, cafe spaces, courtyard gardens) can encourage social interaction and well-being. Quiet and wellness rooms can provide quiet zones or rooms that help improve well-being and mindfulness. Specifically, a designated lactation room can support nursing mothers by providing privacy and helping them return to work more easily.

Biophilic design has been linked to health outcomes such as stress reduction, improved mood, cognitive performance, social engagement, and sleep. Ergonomics can also minimize stress and strain on the body by providing ergonomically designed workstations.

== Occupant engagement ==
While some components of healthy buildings are inherently designed into the built environment, other components rely on the behavioral change of occupants, users, or organizations residing within the building. Well-lit and accessible stairwells can provide building occupants the opportunity to increase regular physical activity. Fitness centers or an exercise room can encourage exercise during the work day, which can improve mood and performance, leading to improved focus and better work-based relationships. Exercise can also be promoted by encouraging alternative means of transportation (e.g., cycling, walking, running) to and from the building. Providing facilities such as bicycle storage and locker/changing rooms can increase the appeal of cycling, walking, or running. Active workstations, such as of sit/stand desks, treadmill desks, or cycle desks, can encourage increased movement and exercise as well."Behavioral measures" can be taken to "encourage better public health outcomes: e.g., reducing sedentary behaviors by increasing access to stairways, using more active transportation options, and working at sit-to-stand desks." Other examples that can promote health and well-being include establishing workplace wellness programs, health promotion campaigns, and encouraging activity and collaboration.

== Infectious disease ==
ASHRAE states that "Transmission of SARS-CoV-2 through the air is sufficiently likely that airborne exposure to the virus should be controlled. Changes to building operations, including the operation of heating, ventilating, and air-conditioning systems, can reduce airborne exposures." Current recommendations include increasing air supply and exhaust ventilation, using operable windows, limiting air recirculation, increasing hours of ventilation system operation and upgraded filtration. Joseph Allen of the Healthy Buildings Program at Harvard suggests 4-6 air changes per hour in classrooms, especially when masks are off.

Proper ventilation of areas has been found to have the same effect as vaccinating 50-60% of the population for influenza. Enhanced filtration using a MERV 13 filter would be adequate to protect against transmission of viruses. Allen mentions three ways humidity can affect transmission: respiratory health, decaying, and virus evaporation. Drier air also dries out the respiratory cilia that catch particles. Viruses decay faster between 40 and 60% humidity. Respiratory droplets that become aerosols are less likely to do so at higher humidity. After 60%, mold growth begins to be encouraged.

Sustainable design of patient rooms, intensive care units, and courtyards could offer opportunities to not only maximize on human safety and wellbeing, but also environmental energy efficiency, waste management recycling, and performance optimization – all of which constitute the core of sustainability. However, this may come at an unexpected cost of enabling growth and spread of opportunistic microbes.

== Health and well-being in standards and rating systems ==
There are several international and governmental standards, guidelines, and building rating systems that incorporate health and well-being concepts:

- AirRated
- ANSI/ASHRAE/USGBC/IES Standard 189.1-2014, Standard for the Design of High-Performance Green Buildings
- BAIOTEQ
- Fitwel
- General Services Administration Facilities Standards for the Public Buildings Service (P-100)
- Green Building Initiative Green Globes
- Leadership in Energy and Environmental Design
- United States Department of Defense Unified Facilities Criteria Program
- WELL Building Standard

== Green Seal Standards for Healthy Buildings and Schools ==
Founded in 1989, Green Seal is a leading global ecolabeling organization (that is part of The Global Ecolabelling Network) that has set strict criteria for occupant health, sustainability, and product performance. The Healthy Green Schools & Colleges initiative assists facility managers in locating low- or no-cost actions that have a significant impact on indoor air quality and health. The curriculum covers the full spectrum of facilities management methods and was created in collaboration with renowned school facility management professionals:

- Indoor Air Quality Testing and Monitoring
- Cleaning and Disinfecting
- Integrated Pest control
- Sustainable Purchasing
- HVAC and Electric management
- Training and intercommunications

== WELL Building Standard Certification ==
The WELL Building Standard Certification was first launched in 2014 (WELL v1), and it focuses on the well-being and health of occupants in buildings. It was developed by Delos Living LLC and is currently administered by the International WELL Building Institute (IWBI) who released the second version (WELL v2) in 2020. Generally speaking, WELL v2 has updated requirements for investigating the relationship between building design and human health, adds more diversity to spaces and applications of the standard, and features a single rating system that resembles USGBC LEED's efforts.

More specifically, WELL v1 discussed 100 performance features that can be considered for the certification of a building. Those 100 performance features are classified into 7 "concepts" as follows: Air, Water, Nourishment, Light, Fitness, Comfort, and Mind. Of these 100 features, 41 were required preconditions, and 59 were optional optimizations. In order to achieve a WELL certification, a building has to meet the following:

- For a WELL silver certification: 41 required preconditions.
- For a WELL gold certification: all the requirements for silver certification plus 40% optimizations.
- For a WELL platinum certification: all the requirements for gold certification plus 80% optimizations.

On the other hand, WELL v2 uses a four-certification system that mimics LEED's scoring system. The required preconditions are decreased to only 23 (vs. 41 in v1), and the optimizations rose to 92 (vs. 59 in v1). WELL v2 also added 3 more "concepts": Sound, Materials and Community. With these updates, more buildings could qualify for a certification under the new system:

- For a WELL bronze certification: 40 points are required (this is only available for shell and core buildings)
- For a WELL silver certification: 50 points are required.
- For a WELL gold certification: 60 points are required.
- For a WELL platinum certification: 80 points are required.

There are some caveats with WELL v2, however. For instance, a building has to meet all required 23 preconditions before qualifying a certification. If one precondition is not satisfied, the building may not proceed with WELL standard certification irrespective of how many points achieved. Additionally, a building must earn at least 4 points in the "Thermal Comfort" and "Air" concepts, and 2 points at minimum in the remainder of the concepts. Lastly, a building can attain a maximum of 110 points because of an additional 10 points that could be achieved for innovation and performance.

Based on most recent surveys more than 72M sqft of residential and commercial spaces have been certified around the globe to date.

== See also ==
- Built environment
- Cleanroom
- Environmental psychology
- Healing environments
- Indoor air quality
- Particulates
- Sustainable refurbishment
- Ventilation (architecture)
