= Design brief =

Type of educational or business document

A design brief is a document for a design project developed by a designer in consultation with a client. The brief outlines the deliverables and scope of the project, including any products or works, function and aesthetics, as well as timing and budget. They can be used in many fields, including architecture, interior design and industrial design. Design briefs are also used to evaluate the effectiveness of a design after it has been produced and during the creation process to keep the project on track. They usually change over time and are adjusted as the project scope evolves.

== See also ==
- Creative brief
- PRINCE2
- Product design specification, a document that describes design specifications
- Project management
