= Psychosociology =

Psychosociology or psycho-sociology is the study of problems common to psychology and sociology, particularly the way individual behavior is influenced by the groups the person belongs to.

For example, in the study of criminals, psychology studies the personality of the criminal shaped by the criminal's upbringing. Sociology studies the behavior of the entire group itself: the methods the criminal group uses to recruits members and the way the group changes over time. Psychosociology studies the criminal's behavior, which is created by the group they belong to, such as the young people living in the same neighborhood block.

== Factors ==
There are many social factors that can affect the psychology of others. An example of this is social cliques. Whether one gets accepted into their desired clique or not, it changes the way they think of themselves, and the people around them. Friendships at young ages while growing up also have much to do with not only psychological development, but social skills and social behavior as well. The same goes for common laws in society. Whether an individual's group decides to obey by them or not, it affects that individual's outlook on the law and their group as a whole. The way people may act or speak dictates the way others see them in a society. For example, individuals can see authority in many different ways depending on their experiences and what others have told them. Because of this, based on people's social knowledge of authority, their opinions and ideas are very different.

== Individuals ==
Every individual has their own unique and personal psychological thought process in which they use to analyze the world around them. People internalize and process sociological factors in ways relative to their psychological thought process. This relationship is reciprocated with one another as society can alter and morph the ways that people think while at the same time, society can be influenced by the externalized psychological thinking of the individuals within the society itself. Due to this, one could see how psychology is instrumental in helping the sociologist to view the wide spread effects of social facts within an individual's behavior.
