= Jose Manuel Sabucedo =

Spanish social psychologist

- José Manuel Sabucedo Cameselle
- Born: February 15, 1955 (age 71); Vigo, Spain
- Board member of: President of the Spanish Scientific Society of Social Psychology

Academic background
- Education: Universidade de Santiago de Compostela
- Thesis: Ideology and attitudes (1982)
- Doctoral advisor: Julio Seoane Rey

Academic work
- Discipline: Psychology
- Sub-discipline: Social psychology
- Institutions: Universidade de Santiago de Compostela

Jose Manuel Sabucedo is a Spanish social psychologist and professor at the Universidade de Santiago de Compostela. His research has focused on collective action, political violence and reconciliation, and he has published in these fields.

== Academic career ==
Sabucedo is director of the research group on social behaviour and applied psychometrics at the Universidade de Santiago de Compostela. He is also president of the Spanish Scientific Society of Social Psychology (SCEPS).

He has served as associate editor of the peer-reviewed Revista Latinoamericana de Psicología since 2009. He was also editor-in-chief of Revista de Psicología Social/International Journal of Social Psychology between 2010 and 2016. During his academic career, he has supervised 18 doctoral theses.

== Recognition ==
In 2007, Sabucedo received the Galicia Research Prize in the senior category. The award recognised 25 years of research in social and political psychology, described as interdisciplinary and socially relevant.
