= George Galster =

American economist

George Charles Galster
- Born: 1948 (age 76–77)
- Education: Ph.D., economics, Massachusetts Institute of Technology; B.S., organizational science, summa cum laude Case Western Reserve University; B.A., economics, summa cum laude, Wittenberg University
- Scientific career
- Fields: Economics, urban studies
- Institutions: Wayne State University
- Thesis: A bid-rent analysis of housing market discrimination (1974)

George Charles Galster (born 1948) is the Clarence Hilberry Professor of Urban Affairs in the Department of Urban Studies & Planning at Wayne State University in Detroit, Michigan, USA.

== Education ==
Galster received his B.A. in economics summa cum laude from Wittenberg University, his B.S. in organizational science, also summa cum laude, from Case Western Reserve University, and his Ph.D. in economics from the Massachusetts Institute of Technology.

== Career ==
Galster joined the Urban Institute in 1993 as a principal research associate, and was its director of housing research from 1994 to 1996, when he joined Wayne State University.

== Research ==
Galster is known for studying urban housing markets, economic segregation in American cities, and housing discrimination against African Americans.

== Views ==
Galster has been critical of the Detroit light rail program, QLine, arguing that it will benefit property owners in the city, rather than those who are too poor to live near the Woodward Avenue corridor. He has also criticized blight removal programs in Detroit for not addressing the root causes of the problem, and has compared them to "putting a Band-Aid on a wound" in this regard. He argues that the root causes of this problem include the construction of thousands of excess homes in Detroit since the 1950s due to the city's deregulated housing market.
