= Environmental psychology =

Academic study of the mind's relationship to one's immediate surroundings

Environmental psychology is a branch of psychology that explores the relationship between humans and the external world. It examines the way in which the natural- and our built environments shape us as individuals. Environmental psychology investigates how humans change the environment and how the environment influences humans' experiences and behaviors. The field defines the term environment broadly, encompassing natural environments, social settings, built environments, learning environments, and informational environments. Another important research area within environmental psychology is the study of humans’ influences on the environment, that is, psychological factors influencing pro-environmental behavior and different ways it can be possible to encourage environmentally friendly behaviors, in order to mitigate climate change and biodiversity loss.

Environmental psychology was not fully recognized as its own field until the late 1960s when scientists began to question the tie between human behavior and our natural and built environments. Since its conception, the field has been committed to the development of a discipline that is both value oriented and problem oriented, prioritizing research aimed at solving complex environmental problems in the pursuit of individual well-being within a larger society.

When solving problems involving human-environment interactions, whether global or local, one must have a model of human nature that predicts the environmental conditions under which humans will respond well. This model can help design, manage, protect and/or restore environments that enhance reasonable behavior, predict the likely outcomes when these conditions are not met, and diagnose problem within the environment. The field develops such a model of human nature while retaining a broad and inherently multidisciplinary focus. It explores such dissimilar issues as common property resource management, wayfinding in complex settings, the effect of environmental stress on human performance, the characteristics of restorative environments, human information processing, and the promotion of durable conservation behavior. Lately, alongside the increased focus on climate change in society and the social sciences and the re-emergence of limits-to-growth concerns, there has been an increased focus on environmental sustainability issues within the field.

This multidisciplinary paradigm has not only characterized the dynamic for which environmental psychology is expected to develop, but it has also been the catalyst in attracting experts and scholars from other fields of study, aside from research psychologists. In environmental psychology, geographers, economists, landscape architects, policy-makers, sociologists, anthropologists, educators, and product developers all have discovered and participated in this field.

Although "environmental psychology" is arguably the best-known and most comprehensive description of the field, it is also known as human factors science, cognitive ergonomics, ecological psychology, ecopsychology, environment–behavior studies, and person–environment studies. Closely related fields include architectural psychology, socio-architecture, behavioral geography, environmental sociology, social ecology, and environmental design research.

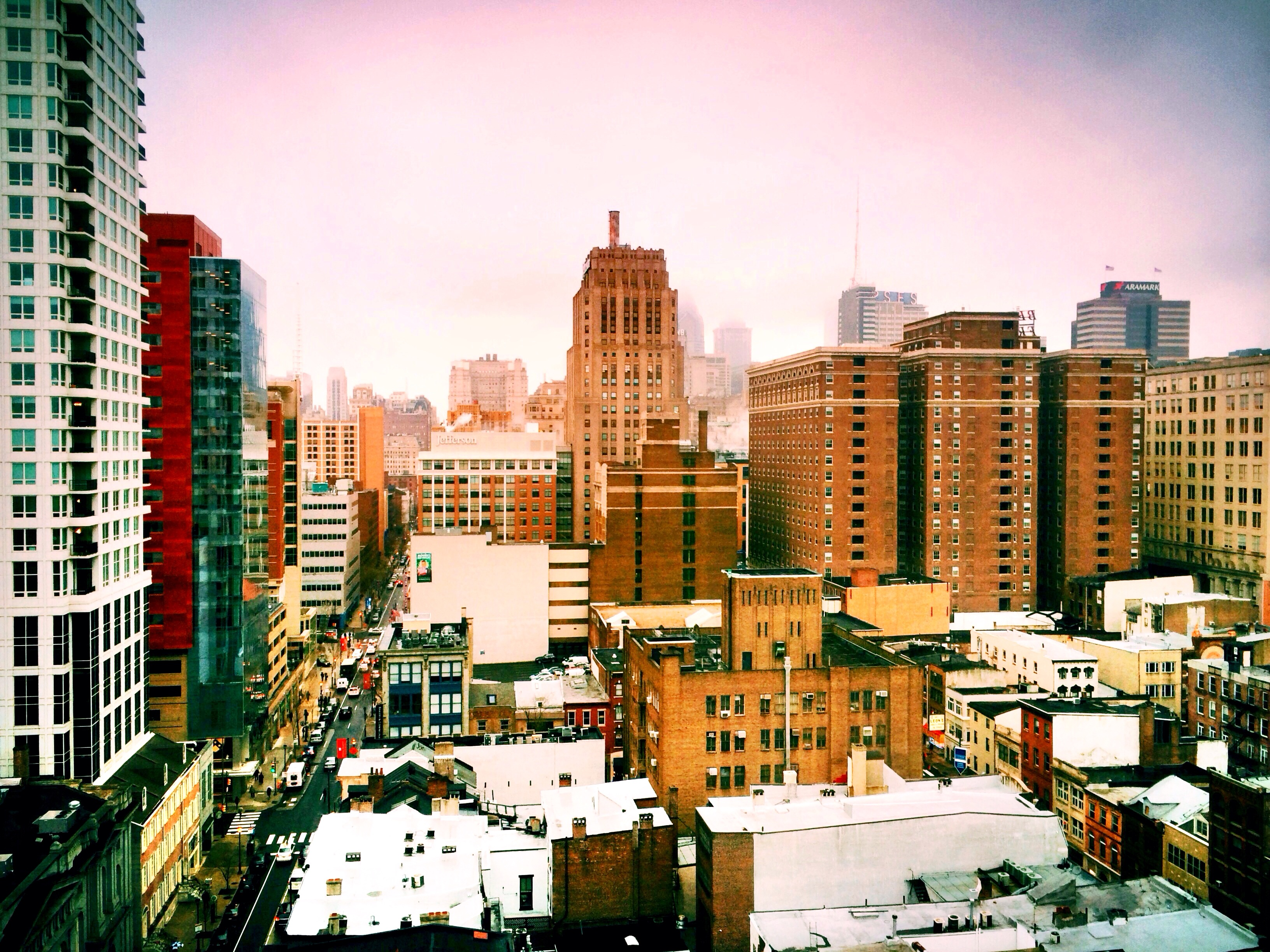
Population density and economic disparities shape mental health.

== History ==
The origins of the field can be traced to the Romantic poets, such as Wordsworth and Coleridge who drew attention to the power of nature intersecting with the significance of human interaction. Darwin pointed to the role of the environment in shaping evolution. This idea was quickly applied to human interactions with the surroundings. An extreme Victorian acceptance of this were 'environmental determinists' who insisted the physical environment and climate influenced the evolution of racial characteristics. Willy Hellpach is said to be the first to mention "environmental psychology". One of his books, Geopsyche, discusses topics such as how the sun and the moon affect human activity, the impact of extreme environments, and the effects of color and form. Among the other major scholars at the roots of environmental psychology were Jakob von Uexküll, Kurt Lewin, Egon Brunswik, and later Gerhard Kaminski and Carl Friedrich Graumann.

The end of World War II brought about a demand for guidance on the urgent building programme after the destruction of war. To provide government planning requirements many countries set up research centered around the studies on how people used space. In the U.K. the Building Research Centre studied space use in houses leading to further study around noise levels, heating, and lighting requirements in a living space. Pilkingtons, a glassmaker company, set up a daylight research unit, led by Thomas Markus to provide information on the influence of natural lighting in buildings and guidelines on daylight requirements. In the 1960s, Peter Manning further developed the study at the Pilkington Research Unit at the University of Liverpool. He studied offices and employed Brian Wells, one of the first people to obtain a Ph.D in environmental psychology.

Markus set up the Building Performance Research Unit at the University of Strathclyde in 1968, employing the psychologist David Canter, whom Wells and Manning had supervised for his Ph.D with the Pilkington Research Unit. Canter then went to the University of Surrey to set up an Environmental Psychology program in 1971 with the Department of Psychology. The head of the department was Terence Lee, who had conducted his PhD on the concept of the neighborhood under the supervision of Sir Frederick Bartlett at the University of Cambridge.

In parallel with these developments, people in the US had begun to consider the issues in environmental design. One of the first areas was the consideration of psychiatric hospitals. Psychiatrists worked with architects to take account of the experiences of patients who experience mental illness and discomfort. Robert Sommer wrote his book on 'Personal Space,' and Edward T Hall, an anthropologist, commented on how people relate to each other spatially. Amos Rapoport caused considerable interest amongst architects with his book 'House Form and Culture', showing that the form of buildings was not solely functional but had all sorts of cultural influences. The idea contributed to the emergence of 'post-modernism' architecture, which took the symbolic qualities of architecture very seriously. These early developments in the 1960s and 1970s were often seen as part of 'architectural psychology'.

When Harold Proshansky and William Ittelson set up the Environmental Psychology program at the City University of New York Graduate Center, the term Environmental Psychology replaces Architectural Psychology, the study of the ways in which people made sense of and interacted with their surroundings. When Canter established The Journal of Environmental Psychology in 1980 with Kenneth Craik a personality psychologist at the University of California at Berkeley, it became institutionalized to use the term environmental psychology. President Nixon's campaign to deal with depredations of the environment gave impetus to a change of direction in the field from aspects of buildings and making sense of cities to the broader issues of climate change and the impact of people in the global environment.

=== Environmental psychologists ===
Environmental psychologists are professionals trained to study the relationship between human behavior and the environment that surrounds them. These psychologists study any type of environment, even "built" environments, such as homes, schools, workplaces, neighbourhoods, parks, and event spaces. They study how we as humans behave and interact in the world. As of May 2020, the annual salary of an environmental psychologist is $82,180. The two sub-disciplines are conservation psychology and ecopsychology. Conservation Psychology is the study of the development of attitudes towards the environment and its preservation. Ecopsychology is similar to conservation psychology, but it focuses on the ties of environmental and societal degradation.

== Orientations ==
=== Problem oriented ===
Environmental psychology is a direct study of the relationship between an environment and how that environment affects its inhabitants. Specific aspects of this field work by identifying a problem and through the identification of the said problem, discovering a solution. Therefore, it is necessary for environmental psychology to be problem-oriented.

One important aspect of a problem-oriented field is that by identifying problems, solutions arise from the research acquired. The solutions can aid in making society function better as a whole and create a wealth of knowledge about the inner workings of societies. Environmental psychologist Harold Proshansky discusses how the field is also "value-oriented" because of the field's commitment to bettering society through problem identification. Panyang discusses the importance of not only understanding the problem but also the necessity of a solution.

Proshansky also points out some of the problems of a problem-oriented approach for environmental psychology. First, the problems being identified must be studied under certain specifications: they must be ongoing and occurring in real life, not in a laboratory. Second, the notions about the problems must derive directly from the source – meaning they must come directly from the specific environment where the problem is occurring. The solutions and understanding of the problems cannot come from an environment that has been constructed and modeled to look like real life. Environmental psychology needs to reflect the actual society, not a society built in a laboratory setting. The difficult task of the environmental psychologist is to study problems as they are occurring in everyday life. It is hard to reject all laboratory research because laboratory experiments are where theories may be tested without damaging the actual environment or can serve as models when testing solutions. Proshansky makes this point as well, discussing the difficulty in the overall problem oriented approach. He states that it is important, however, for the environmental psychologist to utilize all aspects of research and analysis of the findings and to take into account both the general and individualized aspects of the problems.

Environmental psychology addresses environmental problems such as density and crowding, noise pollution, sub-standard living, and urban decay. Noise increases environmental stress. Although it has been found that control and predictability are the greatest factors in stressful effects of noise; context, pitch, source and habituation are also important variables [3]. Environmental psychologists have theorized that density and crowding can also have an adverse effect on mood and may cause stress-related illness or behavior. To understand and solve environmental problems, environmental psychologists believe concepts and principles should come directly from the physical settings and problems being looked at. For example, factors that reduce feelings of crowding within buildings include:

- Windows – particularly ones that can be opened and ones that provide a view as well as light
- High ceilings
- Doors to divide spaces (Baum and Davies) and provide access control
- Room shape – square rooms feel less crowded than rectangular ones (Dresor)
- Using partitions to create smaller, personalized spaces within an open plan office or larger work space.
- Providing increases in cognitive control over aspects of the internal environment, such as ventilation, light, privacy, etc.
- Conducting a cognitive appraisal of an environment and feelings of crowding in different settings. For example, one might be comfortable with crowding at a concert but not in school corridors.
- Creating a defensible space (Calhoun)

==== Personal space and territory ====
Proxemics is known as the study of human space. It also studies the effects that population has on human behavior, communication, and social interaction. Having an area of personal territory in a public space, e.g., at the office, is a key feature of many architectural designs. Having such a 'defensible space' can reduce the negative effects of crowding in urban environments. The term, coined by John B. Calhoun in 1947, is the result of multiple environmental experiments conducted on rats. Originally beginning as an experiment to measure how many rats could be accommodated in a given space, it expanded into determining how rats, given the proper food, shelter and bedding would behave under a confined environment.

Under these circumstances, the males became aggressive, some exclusively homosexual. Others became pansexual and hypersexual, seeking every chance to mount any rat they encountered. As a result, mating behaviors were upset with an increase in infant mortalities. With parents failing to provide proper nests, thoughtlessly ditching their young and even attacking them, infant mortality rose as high as 96% in certain sections. Calhoun published the results as "Population Density and Social Pathology" in a 1962 edition of Scientific American.

=== Systems oriented ===
The systems-oriented approach to experimenting is applied to individuals or people that are a part of communities, groups, and organizations. The integration of communities, groups, and organizations contribute to an environment and influence homeostasis. Homeostasis is known as the "state of steady conditions within a system." This approach particularly examines these group interactions, as opposed to at the individual level and it emphasizes on factors of social integration. In the laboratory, experiments focus on cause and effect processes within human nature.

=== Interdisciplinary oriented ===
Environmental psychology relies on interaction with other disciplines in order to approach problems from multiple perspectives. The first discipline is the category of behavioral sciences, which include: sociology, political science, anthropology, and economics. Environmental psychology also interacts with the other interdisciplinary specialization field of psychology, which include: developmental psychology, cognitive science, industrial and organizational psychology, psychobiology, psychoanalysis, and social neuroscience. This multidisciplinary approach allows for a more comprehensive understanding of human-environment interactions. For instance, sociology provides insights into how social structures and cultural norms influence environmental behaviors, while economics helps analyze the financial incentives and barriers to sustainable practices. Cognitive science contributes to our understanding of how people perceive and process environmental information, which is crucial for developing effective environmental communication strategies. In the study of developmental psychology, Russian-born American psychologist Bronfenbrenner utilized environmental psychology theories from researchers like Kurt Lewin to develop the ecology systems theory that emphasizes that the environment a child is exposed too influences developmental growth and behavior.

In addition to the more scientific fields of study, environmental psychology closely connect with the build environment. For instance, the green building designs promoting well-being and urban planning initiatives encouraging social interaction. Environmental psychology works with the design field which includes: the studies of architecture, interior design, urban planning, industrial and object design, landscape architecture, and preservation. This collaboration between environmental psychology and design fields has led to innovative approaches in creating spaces that enhance human well-being and environmental sustainability. For example, research in environmental psychology has informed the design of restorative environments in healthcare settings, improving patient outcomes. Additionally, insights from the field have contributed to the development of urban spaces that encourage pro-environmental behaviors, such as recycling and energy conservation.

=== Space-over-time orientation ===
Space over time orientation highlights the importance of the past. Examining problems with the past in mind creates a better understanding of how past forces, such as social, political, and economic forces, may be of relevance to present and future problems. Time and place are also important to consider. It is important to look at time over extended periods. Physical settings change over time; they change with respect to physical properties and they change because individuals using the space change over time. Looking at these spaces over time will help monitor the changes and possibly predict future problems.

== Concepts ==
=== Nature restoration ===
Environmental health shows the effects people have on the environment as well as the effects the environment has on people. From early studies showing that patients with a view of nature from their hospital recovered faster than patients with a window view of a brick wall, how, why, and to which extent nature has mental and physical restorative properties has been a central branch of the field. Although the positive effects of nature have been established, the theoretical underpinning of why it is restorative is still discussed. The most cited theory is the Attention Restoration Theory, which claims nature is a “soft fascination” which restores the ability to direct attention. It is said that being in nature can reduce stress. Studies show that it can reduce anger, improve mood, and even lower one's blood pressure.

Secondly, Stress reduction theory claims that because humans have evolved in nature, this type of environment is relaxing, and more adjusted to the senses. Newer theoretical work includes the Conditioned Restoration Theory, which suggests a two-step process. The first step involves associating nature with relaxation, and the second step involves retrieving the same relaxation when presented with an associated stimulus.

=== Place identity ===
For many years Harold Proshansky and his colleagues at the Graduate School and University Center of the City University of New York, explored the concept of place identity. Place identity has been traditionally defined as a 'sub-structure of the self-identity of the person consisting of broadly conceived cognitions about the physical world in which the individual lives'. These cognitions define the daily experiences of every human being. Through one's attitudes, feelings, ideas, memories, personal values and preferences toward the range and type of physical settings, they can then understand the environment they live in and their overall experience.

As a person interacts with various places and spaces, they are able to evaluate which properties in different environments fulfill his/her various needs. When a place contains components that satisfy a person biologically, socially, psychologically and/or culturally, it creates the environmental past of a person. Through 'good' or 'bad' experiences with a place, a person is then able to reflect and define their personal values, attitudes, feelings and beliefs about the physical world.

Place identity has been described as the individual's incorporation of place into the larger concept of self; a "potpourri of memories, conceptions, interpretations, ideas, and related feelings about specific physical settings, as well as types of settings".

Other theorists have been instrumental in the creation of the idea of place identity. Three humanistic geographers, Tuan (1980), Relph (1976) and Buttimer (1980), share a couple of basic assumptions. As a person lives and creates memories within a place, attachment is built and it is through one's personal connection to a place, that they gain a sense of belonging and purpose, which then gives significance and meaning to their life.

Five central functions of place-identity have been depicted: recognition, meaning, expressive-requirement, mediating change, and anxiety and defense function. Place identity becomes a cognitive "database" against which every physical setting is experienced. The activities of a person often overlap with physical settings, which then create a background for the rest of life's interactions and events. The individual is frequently unaware of the array of feelings, values or memories of a singular place and simply becomes more comfortable or uncomfortable with certain broad kinds of physical settings, or prefers specific spaces to others. In the time since the term "place identity" was introduced, the theory has been the model for identity that has dominated environmental psychology.

=== Place attachment ===
According to the book, "Place Attachment", place attachment is a "complex phenomenon that incorporates people-place bonding" Many different perceptions of the bond between people and places have been hypothesized and studied. The most widespread terms include place attachment and sense of place. One consistent thread woven throughout most recent research on place attachment deals with the importance of the amount of time spent at a certain place (the length of association with a place). While both researchers and writers have made the case that time and experience in a place are important for deepening the meanings and emotional ties central to the person-place relationship, little in-depth research has studied these factors and their role in forging this connection.

Place attachment is defined as one's emotional or affective ties to a place, and is generally thought to be the result of a long-term connection with a certain environment. This is different from a simple aesthetic response such as saying a certain place is special because it is beautiful. For example, one can have an emotional response to a beautiful (or ugly) landscape or place, but this response may sometimes be shallow and fleeting. This distinction is one that Schroeder labeled "meaning versus preference". According to Schroeder the definition of "meaning" is "the thoughts, feelings, memories and interpretations evoked by a landscape"; whereas "preference" is "the degree of liking for one landscape compared to another". For a deeper and lasting emotional attachment to develop (Or in Schroeder's terms, for it to have meaning) an enduring relationship with a place is usually a critical factor. Chigbu carried out a rural study of place-attachment using a qualitative approach to check its impact on a community, Uturu (in Nigeria), and found that it has a direct relationship to the level of community development.

=== Environmental consciousness ===
Leanne Rivlin theorized that one way to examine an individual's environmental consciousness is to recognize how the physical place is significant, and look at the people/place relationship.

Environmental cognition (involved in human cognition) plays a crucial role in environmental perception.

All different areas of the brain engage with environmentally relevant information. Some believe that the orbitofrontal cortex integrates environmentally relevant information from many distributed areas of the brain. Due to its anterior location within the frontal cortex, the orbitofrontal cortex may make judgments about the environment, and refine the organism's "understanding" through error analysis, and other processes specific to the prefrontal cortex. But to be certain, there is no single brain area dedicated to the organism's interactions with its environment. Rather, all brain areas are dedicated to this task. One area (probably the orbitofrontal cortex) may collate the various pieces of the informational puzzle in order to develop a long term strategy of engagement with the ever-changing "environment".

Moreover, the orbitofrontal cortex may show the greatest change in blood oxygenation (BOLD level) when an organism thinks of the broad, and amorphous category referred to as "the environment". Research in this area is showing an increase in climate change related emotional experiences that are seen to be inherently adaptive. Engagement with these emotional experiences leads to a greater sense of connection with others and increased capacity to tolerate and reflect on emotions.

Because of the recent concern with the environment, environmental consciousness or awareness has come to be related to the growth and development of understanding and consciousness toward the biophysical environment and its problems.

=== Behavior settings ===
The earliest noteworthy discoveries in the field of environmental psychology can be dated back to Roger Barker who created the field of ecological psychology. Founding his research station in Oskaloosa, Kansas in 1947, his field observations expanded into the theory that social settings influence behavior. Empirical data gathered in Oskaloosa from 1947 to 1972 helped him develop the concept of the "behavior setting" to help explain the relationship between the individual and the immediate environment. This was further explored in his work with Paul Gump in the book Big School, Small School: High School Size and Student Behavior. One of the first insightful explanations on why groups tend to be less satisfying for their members as they increase in size, their studies illustrated that large schools had a similar number of behavior settings to that of small schools. This resulted in the students' ability to presume many different roles in small schools (e.g. be in the school band and the school football team) but in larger schools, there was a propensity to deliberate over their social choices.

In his book Ecological Psychology (1968), Barker stresses the importance of the town's behavior and environment as the residents' most ordinary instrument of describing their environment. "The hybrid, eco-behavioral character of behavior settings appear to present Midwest's inhabitants with no difficulty; nouns that combine milieu and standing behavior are common, e.g. oyster supper, basketball game, turkey dinner, golden gavel ceremony, cake walk, back surgery, gift exchange, livestock auction, auto repair."

Barker argued that his students should implement T-methods (psychologist as 'transducer': i.e. methods in which they studied the man in his 'natural environment') rather than O-methods (psychologist as "operators" i.e. experimental methods). Basically, Barker preferred fieldwork and direct observation rather than controlled experiments. Some of the minute-by-minute observations of Kansan children from morning to night, jotted down by young and maternal graduate students, may be the most intimate and poignant documents in social science. Barker spent his career expanding on what he called ecological psychology, identifying these behavior settings, and publishing accounts such as One Boy's Day (1952) and Midwest and Its Children (1955).

== Natural environment research findings ==
Environmental psychology research has observed various concepts relating to humans' innate connection to natural environments which begins in early childhood. One study shows that fostering children's connectedness to nature will, in turn, create habitual pro-ecological behaviors in time. Exposure to natural environment may lead to a positive psychological well-being and form positive attitudes and behavior towards nature. Connectedness to nature has shown to be a huge contributor to predicting people's general pro-ecological and pro-social behaviors. Connectedness to nature has also been shown to benefit well-being, happiness, and general satisfaction. "Nature-deficit disorder" has recently been coined to explain the lack of connectedness to nature due to a lack of consciousness identification and nature disconnect. Further research is required to make definitive claims about the effects of connectedness to nature.

These positive mental health effects of environmental exposure and connection continue through adulthood and can be applied to work and other settings. One study found that nurses who weren't exposed to any natural elements throughout their work day would obtain a significantly lower score on scales measuring mental health, job satisfaction, and overall well-being. Additionally, the nurses who were not exposed to any natural elements were more likely to show signs of depression and anxiety than those who were exposed to natural elements throughout their work day.

== Applications ==
=== Impact on the built environment ===
Environmental psychologists rejected the laboratory-experimental paradigm because of its simplification and skewed view of the cause-and-effect relationships of human behaviors and experiences. Environmental psychologists examine how one or more parameters produce an effect while other measures are controlled. It is impossible to manipulate real-world settings in a laboratory.

Environmental psychology is oriented towards influencing the work of design professionals (architects, engineers, interior designers, urban planners, etc.) and thereby improving the human environment.

On a civic scale, efforts toward improving pedestrian landscapes have paid off, to some extent, from the involvement of figures like Jane Jacobs and Copenhagen's Jan Gehl. One prime figure here is the late writer and researcher William H. Whyte. His still-refreshing and perceptive "City", based on his accumulated observations of skilled Manhattan pedestrians, provides steps and patterns of use in urban plazas.

The role and impact of architecture on human behavior is debated within the architectural profession. Views range from: supposing that people will adapt to new architectures and city forms; believing that architects cannot predict the impact of buildings on humans and therefore should base decisions on other factors; to those who undertake detailed precedent studies of local building types and how they are used by that society.

Environmental psychology has conquered the whole architectural genre which is concerned with retail stores and any other commercial venues that have the power to manipulate the mood and behavior of customers (e.g. stadiums, casinos, malls, and now airports). From Philip Kotler's landmark paper on Atmospherics and Alan Hirsch's "Effects of Ambient Odors on Slot-Machine Usage in a Las Vegas Casino", through the creation and management of the Gruen transfer, retail relies heavily on psychology, original research, focus groups, and direct observation. One of William Whyte's students, Paco Underhill, makes a living as a "shopping anthropologist". Most of this advanced research remains a trade secret and proprietary.

Environmental psychology is consulted thoroughly when discussing future city design. Eco-cities and eco-towns have been studied to determine the societal benefits of creating more sustainable and ecological designs. Eco-cities allow for humans to live in synch with nature and develop sustainable living techniques. The development of eco-cities requires knowledge in the interactions between "environmental, economic, political, and socio-cultural factors based on ecological principles". By increasing the focus on applying environmental psychology principles to urban planning and policy-making, we can create more livable and sustainable communities.

=== Emerging of Technology ===
As new technologies emerge, environmental psychologists research how these technologies are changing human-environment relationships. Smart home and city technologies are reshaping the human-environment relationship by creating more responsive and interactive living spaces. In many urban cities, technology was leveraged to promote sustainable behaviors, such as energy conservation and waste recycling, influencing individual daily habits. The urban design allow a living environment to be more adaptive and responsive to human behavior patterns. Smart home and city technologies open up opportunities for nudging sustainable behaviors but introduce corresponding privacy concerns. Environmental psychologists engage in research on the potential benefits, but also the risks, that these technologies have to promote well-being and environmental sustainability. As these technologies continue to evolve, they are doing far more than merely changing the environments we inhabit, they are also changing the ways in which we study and understand human-environment interactions.

=== Organizations ===
- Project for Public Spaces (PPS) is a nonprofit organization that works to improve public spaces, particularly parks, civic centers, public markets, downtowns, and campuses. The staff of PPS is made up of individuals trained in environmental design, architecture, urban planning, urban geography, urban design, environmental psychology, landscape architecture, arts administration and information management. The organization has collaborated with many major institutions to improve the appearance and functionality of public spaces throughout the United States. In 2005, PPS co-founded The New York City Streets Renaissance, a campaign that worked to develop a new campaign model for transportation reform. This initiative implemented the transformation of excess sidewalk space in the Meatpacking District of Manhattan into public space. Also, by 2008, New York City reclaimed 49 acres (200,000 m^{2}) of traffic lanes and parking spots away from cars and gave it back to the public as bike lanes and public plazas.
- The Center for Human Environments at the CUNY Graduate Center is a research organization that examines the relationship between people and their physical settings. CHE has five subgroups that specialize in aiding specific populations: The Children's Environments Research Group, the Health and Society Research Group, the Housing Environments Research Group, the Public Space Research Group, and the Youth Studies Research Group.
- The most relevant scientific groups are the International Association of People-Environment Studies (IAPS) and the Environmental Design Research Association (EDRA).
- Urban Ecology, The Urban Ecologist, and the International Eco-City Conference were some of the first collectives to establish the idea of eco-cities and townships.

== Challenges ==
The field saw significant research findings and a fair surge of interest in the late 1970s and early 1980s, but has seen challenges of nomenclature, obtaining objective and repeatable results, scope, and the fact that some research rests on underlying assumptions about human perception, which is not fully understood. Being an interdisciplinary field is difficult because it lacks a solid definition and purpose. It is hard for the field to fit into organizational structures. In the words of Guido Francescato, speaking in 2000, environmental psychology encompasses a "somewhat bewildering array of disparate methodologies, conceptual orientations, and interpretations... making it difficult to delineate, with any degree of precision, just what the field is all about and what might it contribute to the construction of society and the unfolding of history."

As environmental issues become increasingly urgent, environmental psychology is likely to play a more prominent role in addressing global challenges. A grand challenge in the field of environmental psychology today is to understand the impact of human behavior on the climate and climate change. Understanding why some people engage in pro-environment behaviors can help predict the necessary requirements to engage others in making sustainable change.

Environmental psychology has not received nearly enough supporters to be considered an interdisciplinary field within psychology. Harold M. Proshansky was one of the founders of environmental psychology and was quoted as saying "As I look at the field of environmental psychology today, I am concerned about its future. It has not, since its emergence in the early 1960s grown to the point where it can match the fields of social, personality, learning or cognitive psychology. To be sure, it has increased in membership, in the number of journals devoted to it, and even in the amount of professional organizational support it enjoys, but not enough so that one could look at any major university and find it to be a field of specialization in a department of psychology, or, more importantly, in an interdisciplinary center or institute".

== University courses ==
- University of Groningen offers a graduate program in environmental psychology focusing on the interactions between people and their environment. The program is taught by the world-leading Environmental Psychology group at the University of Groningen.
- University of Victoria offers general and advanced undergraduate courses in environmental psychology, and graduate courses in Psychology and Nature, as well as Environmental Psychology of the Built Environment. The psychology graduate department also offers individualized master's and PhD programs in Environmental Psychology under the supervision of Dr. Robert Gifford.
- Antioch University New England Graduate School offers graduate programs involving environmental education through a planning approach. With environmental psychology being such a diverse field with many different approaches, students have a variety of programs to choose from.
- Arizona State University offers a master's in Environmental Resources, which takes more of a planning approach to the field.
- The Environmental Psychology Ph.D program at the CUNY Graduate Center takes a multidisciplinary approach to examining and changing "the serious problems associated with the urban environment with a view towards affecting public policy" using social science theory and research methods. The GC-CUNY was the first academic institution in the U.S. to grant a Ph.D. in Environmental Psychology. As discussed in detail on the program website, "recent research has addressed the experiences of recently housed homeless people, the privatization of public space, socio-spatial conflicts, children's safety in the public environment, relocation, community based approaches to housing, the design of specialized environments such as museums, zoos, gardens and hospitals, the changing relationships between home, family and work, the environmental experiences of gay men and lesbians, and access to parks and other urban 'green spaces'." See also The Center for Human Environments.
- Cornell University's department of Design and Environmental Analysis offers undergraduate and graduate (Master of Science in Human Environment Relations, Master of Arts in Design, and Ph.D in Human Behavior and Design) studies in environmental psychology, interior design, sustainable design studies, human factors and ergonomics, and facility planning and management.
- Drexel University offers a Master of Science degree in Design Research. Of two degree paths, the Environmental Design and Health path includes study with community practitioners and researchers in design and related fields, including health, community design, and public policy. Research typically includes data collection and engaged research practices of design thinking and participatory design. This area of investigation has the potential to create innovative health and educational partnerships, economic opportunities and neighborhood initiatives and relates to the strategic mission of the university to be highly engaged in civic sustainability.
- Inland Norway University of Applied Sciences offers a Masters in Environmental psychology. The focus is on how people are affected by both physical and virtual environments, as well as how people affect nature. The program offers courses on environmental behaviour, environment and neuroscience, human factors, virtual environments and cognitive design, change management and greening organizations and architecture and aesthetics.
- The Ohio State University City & Regional Planning Program, in the School of Architecture, offers a specialization in environmental psychology (urban design/physical planning and behavior) at both the master's and PhD level. Dissertations have examined such topics as environmental aesthetics, spatial cognition, ethnic enclaves, neighborhood decline, neighborhood satisfaction, restorative and livable places, and behavior change.
- Prescott College offers a master's program that incorporates a number of the foundations of environmental psychology as well. The sub-fields in which the program provides includes environmental education, environmental studies, ecology, botany, resource policy, and planning.
- University of California, Irvine offers a doctoral specialization in Design & Behavior Research within the Department of Planning, Policy, and Design in the School of Social Ecology, and undergraduate coursework in Environmental Psychology offered jointly by the Departments of Psychology and Social Behavior, Planning, Policy, and Design, and the Program in Public Health.
- The University of Michigan offers Master of Science and Master of Arts degrees in its new School for Sustainability and Environment (SEAS). The focus is on how people affect and are affected by environments, and includes a pragmatic approach to promoting environmental stewardship behavior, as well as a focus on how "nearby nature" affects people's mental vitality, physical health and well-being. An emerging theme is helping people to remain optimistic while learning to respond well to increasingly difficult biophysical circumstances.
- Another strain of environmental psychology developed out of ergonomics in the 1960s. The beginning of this movement can be traced back to David Canter's work and the founding of the "Performance Research Unit" at the University of Strathclyde in Glasgow, Scotland, in 1966, which expanded traditional ergonomics to study broader issues relating to the environment and the extent to which human beings were "situated" within it (cf situated cognition). Canter led the field in the UK for years and was the editor of the Journal of Environmental Psychology for over 20 years, but has recently turned his attention to criminology.
- The University of Surrey was the first institution that offered an architectural psychology course in the UK starting in 1973. Since then, there have been over 250 graduates from over 25 countries. The Environmental Psychology Research Group (EPRG) within the University of Surrey, of which students on the M.Sc in Environmental Psychology are automatically members, has been undertaking research for more than thirty years. EPRG's mission is to gain a better understanding of the environmental and psychological effects of space, no matter the size, with help from social sciences, psychology, and methodologies. There are four categories under which the research projects fall: sustainable development, environmental risk, architectural assessment and environmental design, and environmental education and interpretation. Other universities in the UK now offer courses on the subject, which is an expanding field.

See the APA's list of additional environmental psychology graduate programs here: http://www.apadivisions.org/division-34/about/resources/graduate-programs.aspx

== Academic and professional bodies ==
The main academic and professional organizations for the discipline of Environmental Psychology are Division 34: Society for Environmental, Population, & Conservation Psychology of the American Psychological Association (APA), the International Association of People-Environment Studies (IAPS), Division 4: Environmental Psychology of the International Association of Applied Psychology (IAAP), the Environmental Psychology Section of the German Psychological Society (DGPs), and the Environmental Psychology Section of the British Psychological Society.

== Academic journals ==
There are several peer-reviewed psychological journals that publish academic work on environmental psychology: Journal of Environmental Psychology, Environment and Behavior, Umweltpsychologie, Global Environmental Psychology, Current Research in Ecological and Social Psychology, Frontiers in Psychology: Section for Environmental Psychology.

Academic work also appears in interdisciplinary journals that have a broad thematic focus: Global Environmental Change, Journal of Environmental Communication, Energy Research & Social Science, Nature Climate Change, Nature Human Behaviour, or PLOS One.

Journals in the related field of Ecopsychology may also publish environmental psychological research. These journals include Ecological Psychology (journal), PsyEcology, Journal of Ecopsychology, and European Journal of Ecopsychology.

== Other contributors ==
Other notable researchers and writers in this field include:

- Linda Steg, Professor of Environmental Psychology. Lead author of the IPCC special report in 2017 and awarded the Stevin Prize in 2020.
- David Canter, Emeritus Professor at The University of Liverpool. Developed the Environmental Psychology Program at the University of Surrey in 1971 and established, with Kenneth Craik The Journal of Environmental Psychology in 1980. Best known for his "Psychology of Place" theory and his development of building evaluations as part of the Building Performance Research Unit at The University of Strathclyde.
- Irwin Altman, Distinguished Professor Emeritus, University of Utah
- Robert Gifford, Ph.D. Department of Psychology University of Victoria. Current Editor of the Journal of Environmental Psychology and author of Environmental Psychology: Principles and Practice (5th edition, 2014).
- James J. Gibson, Best known for coining the word affordance, a description of what the environment offers the animal in terms of action
- Roger Hart Professor of Environmental Psychology, Director of the Center for Human Environments and the Children's Environments Research Group, The Graduate Center, City University of New York
- Rachel and Stephen Kaplan, Professors of psychology at the University of Michigan, the Kaplans are known for their research on the effect of nature on people's relationships and health, including Attention Restoration Theory and are renowned in the field of environmental psychology
- Cindi Katz, Professor of Environmental Psychology, The Graduate Center, City University of New York
- Setha Low, Professor of Environmental Psychology and Director of the Public Space Research Group, The Graduate Center, City University of New York
- Kevin A. Lynch and his research into the formation of mental maps
- Francis T. McAndrew, Cornelia H. Dudley Professor of Psychology at Knox College and author of "Environmental Psychology" (1993).
- Bill Mollison, developed the Environmental Psychology Unit at the University of Tasmania, and also Permaculture with David Holmgren
- Amos Rapoport, Distinguished Professor Emeritus Department of Architecture
- Leanne Rivlin, Professor of Environmental Psychology, The Graduate Center, City University of New York
- Susan Saegert, Director of the Environmental Psychology PhD Program and of the Housing Environments Research Group at the City University of New York
- Perla Serfaty, Moroccan-born French and Canadian academic, sociologist, psychosociologist, writer; 2018 inductee into the International Association of People-Environment Studies Hall of Fame
- Robert Sommer, a pioneer of the field who first studied personal space in the 1950s and is perhaps best known for his 1969 book Personal Space: The Behavioral Basis of Design, but is also the author of numerous other books, including Design Awareness, and hundreds of articles.
- Daniel Stokols, Chancellor's Professor, School of Social Ecology, University of California, Irvine; edited Handbook of Environmental Psychology with Irwin Altman; author, Perspectives on Environment and Behavior; co-author, Health, Behavior, and Environmental Stress with Sheldon Cohen, Gary Evans, and David Krantz
- Allan Wicker, who expanded behavior setting theories to include other areas of study, including qualitative research, and social psychology.
- Gary Winkel, Professor of Environmental Psychology, The Graduate Center, City University of New York
- James A. Swan, professor, media producer and writer who authored one of the first popular articles on environmental education, produced symposiums on the Gaia Hypothesis and the significance of place, produced several documentary films on environmental topics and Co-Executive Producer of the Wild Justice TV series on the National Geographic Channel.
- David Uzzell, first Professor of Environmental Psychology in UK, University of Surrey. Research on public understandings of climate crisis, behaviour change and environmental practices, environmental labour studies, environmental risk, heritage interpretation.

== See also ==
- Aesthetics
- Architectural psychology in Germany
- Biophilia hypothesis
- Children, Youth and Environments (journal)
- Climatotherapy
- Cognitive geography
- Conservation psychology
- Crime prevention through environmental design
- Deep ecology
- Eco-anxiety
- Ecological empathy
- Environmental dependence syndrome
- Evolutionary psychology
- Feng shui
- Healing environments
- Healthy building
- Hostile architecture
- Interior design psychology
- Journal of Environmental Psychology
- Mental environment
- Nidotherapy
- Situational strength
- Social psychology
