= Architectural psychology in Germany =

Architectural and environmental psychology developed within the German-speaking world in the 1970s. In 1972, W.F.E. Preiser stated: “What is of special interest to environmental psychologists are the rules by which person-environment relationships are determined and adjustments to changing environmental conditions are enabled within cultural realms. Designers of environments, in particular architects and city planners, need measurements on how the variables they have manipulated affect users.” Early concepts revolved around the psychosocial roles of public and private space, interpersonal conflict, quality of living, and noise pollution. Later concepts explore the relationship between built environments and climate change.

== Beginnings of architectural psychology within the German-speaking world ==
One of the first comprehensive overviews of work in environmental psychology is Lenelis Kruse-Graumann’s dissertation (1974), which was supervised by Carl-Friedrich Graumann. Around the same time, Ernst-Dieter Lantermann published his dissertation Solidarität und Wohnen ["Solidarity and Living"]. Pioneering insights were also generated by seminars in which psychologists and architects worked together and provided impulses for further research. In 1986, architects Peter Jockusch and Lenelis Kruse-Graumann taught together at the University of Kassel. In 1985, 1986 and 1987, continued education seminars were held at the University of Tübingen entitled "Living in built environments. Psychological aspects of architectural design." These seminars were led by Gerhard Kaminski and his departmental colleagues as well as the architect Klaus Brendle. As early as 1970, Kaminski received an invitation to cooperate with architects of the Sonderforschungsbereich (SFB) 63 (Research Area 63), the research area for higher education buildings at the University of Stuttgart. In 1974, Kaminski worked with architects from SFB 64 on plane load-bearing structures and the fundamentals of design. These early projects contributed to the establishment of environmental psychology in Germany.

== Environmental psychology’s position among neighboring disciplines ==
Carl-Friedrich Graumann of the University of Heidelberg started a DFG (Deutsche Forschungsgemeinschaft) program entitled "Psychological Ecology", which led to a "city-psychological" project. Gerhard Kaminski and Lenelis Kruse-Graumann, by founding a disciplinary group for Environmental Psychology within the German Society for Psychology (Deutsche Gesellschaft für Psychologie) in 1994, achieved a disciplinary space for ecological psychology (and, therewith, also for architectural psychology) within academia. Researcher Rotraut Walden has conducted international academic research in the field as an active participant in symposia for International Building Performance Evaluation (IBPE) and at congresses hosted by the Environmental Design Research Association (EDRA) and the International Association of People-Environment Studies (IAPS). Her book Schools for the Future (2009) features contributions by members of the EDRA. The 2004 IAPS meeting in Vienna propagated architectural psychology and building evaluation for EU-candidate countries in Eastern Europe, in which western evaluation methods play an important role in designs for innovations within emerging economies.

== The concepts of ‘private space’ and ‘neighborhoods’ ==
One of the first professorial dissertations (Habilitationsschrift) dealing with architectural psychology by Lenelis Kruse-Graumann was published in 1980. Volker Linneweber completed a professorial dissertation in 1991 entitled "Interpersonale Konflikte im Alltag. Auseinandersetzungen zwischen Nachbarn – Störungen und Beeinträchtigungen im privaten Wohnbereich" ["Interpersonal conflicts in daily life. Disputes between neighbors – disturbances and adverse effects within private living spaces"]. In it, ‘living’ is defined as both an individual and interpersonal occurrence and involves concepts of design and use of private space as well as socio-psychological processes: normative expectations, demands, hopes, social influences and conflicts.

== Psychology of living ==
Antje Flade’s book Wohnen psychologisch betrachtet ["Living from a psychological perspective"] specifically deals with living environment. It was first published in 1987 and a new edition was released in 2006. The book not only interested colleagues within her discipline but also people within the fields of architecture and the housing industry. Antje Flade is considered to be an expert in the psychology of living and in mobility research within the German-speaking world. Works devoted to quality of living also include Psychologie des Wohnungs- und Siedlungsbaus ["Psychology of apartment and housing development construction"] published in 1993 by Hans-Joachim Harloff of Technische Universität Berlin and the dissertation Lebendiges Wohnen ["Lively living"] by Rotraut Walden.

== Environmental psychology and the psychology of constructed environments ==
A pioneering book on environmental psychology was published in 1976 by Gerhard Kaminski. Roger G. Barker published an important collection on the behavior-setting approach in 1986, which was edited by Kaminski. The handbook Ökologische Psychologie ["Ecological Psychology"] published by Lenelis Kruse-Graumann, Carl-Friedrich Graumann and Ernst-Dieter Lantermann in 1990 and 1996 covers, among other things, several topics related to architectural psychology that helped establish the discipline. It deals, for example, with the concepts of ‘appropriation’ (Graumann), ‘behavior-setting analysis’ (Kaminski), ‘person-environment congruence’ (Fuhrer) and ‘control and loss of control’ (Fischer and Stephan). Additional subjects include ‘children and environment’ (Flade), ‘school learning environments’ (Linneweber), ‘museums’ (Klein), ‘working environments’ (Schmale), ‘office environments’ (Schaible-Rapp), ‘therapeutic environments’ (Welter), ‘the sick and disabled’ (Day) and ‘nursing homes’ (Saup). In 1993, Winfried Saup published a comprehensive work on aging and environment. Dieckmann, Flade, Schuemer, Ströhlein and Walden popularized many architecture-psychological studies in Germany by citing them in the book Psychologie und gebaute Umwelt ["Psychology and built environments"] (1998). They also describe basic theoretical principles and methods that have provided German researchers with a knowledge base and framework for further research. Jürgen Hellbrück and Manfred Fischer brought together many architecture-psychological topics in their comprehensive book Umweltspsychologie ["Environmental psychology"] (1999). It describes psychic-material and spatial-social environments, living, surroundings and cities.

== Noise, sound pollution and contributions on acoustics ==
In 1999 August Schick, Maria Klatte and Markus Meis presented conclusions on research related to classroom acoustics, which have been significant for the construction of schools. Hearing and noise researcher Schick led nine symposia on the psychology of acoustics at the University of Oldenburg in which he brought together scholars from different fields to form an interdisciplinary research group that is still working productively in Oldenburg to this day. While their research has not necessarily received wide reception within the field of environmental psychology, it is of significance to the international community of psycho-acoustic researchers, such as those affiliated with the Inter-Noise conference, the International Congress on Noise Control Engineering, and the German Society for Acoustics. August Schick helped found all of these organizations. For twenty years (1985-2005), Schick and Rainer Guski were involved in the research group Interdisziplinäre Lärmwirkungsforschung [Interdisciplinary sound effect research] at the Federal Environmental Agency in Berlin. Rainer Guski has been devoted to the protection of resident populations from street and air-traffic noise since the 1970s. His work establishes the connection between outdoor noise and noise pollution, and he consults politicians on setting noise-level limits for communities. Current research on office acoustics is being conducted by Sabine Schlittmeier and Jürgen Hellbrück at the Catholic University of Eichstätt-Ingolstadt. The effects of acoustics on work performance and feeling of well-being as well as different methods for controlling acoustics are of particular interest to architects, building and room acousticians and interior architects and designers.

== Current efforts in environmental psychology – and their relationship to climate protection ==
Environmental psychology in Germany today has turned predominantly toward the climate – toward climate research, prevention of catastrophe, research related to environmental systems, sustainability and reduction of waste. Nevertheless, IPUblic-Psychologie im Umwelt [Psychology in the environment] devoted a special-edition publication to the topic of architectural psychology in 2003. Pabst Science Publishers regularly publishes a magazine called Environmental Psychology, devoted, though not exclusively, to the theme of its title; two editions, however, dealt with "Public Spaces" (2003) and "City Psychology" (2006).

== The bridge between climate protection and architectural psychology ==
Volker Linneweber of the University of Saarbrücken and Ernst-Dieter Lantermann of the University of Kassel are publishing a forthcoming encyclopedia entitled Spezifische Umwelten und umweltbezogenes Handeln ["Specific environments and environmentally related behavior"], in which both behaviors related to climate protection (addressed by Florian Kaiser and Petra Schweizer-Ries), environmental risks and the latest German architecture-psychological environment-behavior research are included. The volume also incorporates authors such as Rainer Guski, Jürgen Hellbrück and August Schick Raum on acoustics and noise as well as human behavior and experience. Urs Fuhrer summarizes information related to children and teens under the heading Umwelten und ihre Nutzer ["Environments and their users"]. Claudi Quaiser-Pohl addresses spezifische Handlingsfelder ["special fields of operation"] within the rubric Spielen und Lernen ["Playing and learning"]. Riklef Rambow describes the relationship between architecture and psychology, while Hans-Joachim Harloff deals with city planning.

== New publications specific to architectural psychology ==
Riklef Rambow combined methods from architectural psychology, expert research and the psychology of communication in his 2000 dissertation, to develop a model for mediating architecture to laypeople. He has since applied this model to the training of architects and city planners and has contributed a psychology perspective to contemporary debates surrounding the promotion of a building culture in Germany and Austria (Rambow 2007). An additional book entitled Architekturspychologie ["Architectural psychology"] published by Peter G. Richter in Dresden in 2004 is marketed as an instructional book and features several different authors, theoretical approaches and empirical studies.

== Psychological concepts for evaluation of schools, universities and offices ==
In her professorial dissertation, Rotraut Walden focuses architecture-psychological research on “performance,” “well-being” and “control over one’s environment” in relation to schools, higher education institutions and office buildings – namely, the Waldorf School in Cologne built by Peter Hübner of Neckartenzlingen, the campus of the University of Koblenz built by the architecture firm Ackermann, Dück and Schneider of Speyer and the post office tower in Bonn built by Murphy/Jahn of Chicago among many others. Walden’s research advanced an interdisciplinary approach that drew from pedagogical psychology as well as social and organizational psychology. Points addressed within the publication include:

- The development of the Koblenz Architectural Survey: This questionnaire contributes to approaches on Building Performance Evaluation by linking built environments with human reactions to these environments and isolating this link for further evaluation. Six criteria draw from established benchmarks for evaluating buildings according to major types of and trends in architecture: functional architecture, architecture highly influences by aesthetic principles, social-psychical modes of building (which limit social conflicts via layout), ecological concepts, and buildings that achieve organizational requirements within specific budgets. These criteria have never been applied to psychological research. The Koblenz Architectural Survey was developed to flexibly adjust to each object of research to which it is applied.
- Measurement of a building’s orientation toward the future: Collected data is analyzed via t-tests, correlations and regression analyses to understand how specific design elements influence the criteria of performance, well-being, and control over one’s environment. The survey is structured to yield comparisons between actual conditions and desired improvements for the future. A guiding question is whether individual design elements meet the criteria for contributing to a so-called ‘building of the future.’ Buildings are evaluated according to innovative, future-oriented characteristics, which allows this method to adapt to different points in time and with each advance in building design and conceptualization.
- Impact on planning and construction of architectural psychology: The results of Walden’s approach are directly applicable to builders and architects’ projects. The approach is not only intended to yield academic insights but also to be of practical relevance.
