= Allan Wicker =

Allan W. Wicker (born 1941) studied with the founders of ecological psychology, Roger G. Barker and Herbert Wright, in the social psychology program at the University of Kansas, where he earned the Ph.D. in 1967. He taught at the University of Wisconsin, Milwaukee and the University of Illinois, Champaign-Urbana before taking a position at Claremont Graduate School (now Claremont Graduate University) in 1971, where he was a professor of psychology until early retirement in 1999. He is currently an emeritus professor.

== Best-known contributions ==
Wicker is recognized for significant contributions to ecological psychology and for a widely cited paper on the attitude-behavior relationship.

=== Ecological Psychology ===
His Introduction to Ecological Psychology (1979) was praised by reviewers for providing a readable and personal account of the empirical and theoretical works of ecological psychologists. One reviewer noted these contributions of the text: connection of ecological psychology with other specialties in psychology and with related disciplines, revision of traditional positions that Wicker viewed as unnecessarily restrictive, and "development of original, constructive advances within the [ecological psychology] framework".

In subsequent publications, Wicker sought to refine and elaborate the basic environmental unit of ecological psychology, the behavior setting. According to Scott, "Wicker emerged as the individual in this group of researchers [ecological psychologists following Barker] who has taken the theoretical conceptualizations the farthest. Wicker (1987) proposed four extensions of behavior setting theory, now adding considerations of the life cycles of behavior settings, the larger contextual environments of the molar level setting environments, the individuals within the settings (this point brought him into some disagreement with the classicists), and more practical applications of settings".

=== Social Psychology ===
In 1969, Wicker published a review paper on the relationship between verbal expressions of attitudes and overt behaviors that stimulated much debate and research in social psychology. The paper was designated a "citation classic" in 1980.

== Honors and recognition ==
Wicker was elected a Fellow of the following divisions of the American Psychological Association: Society for Personality and Social Psychology, Society for Industrial and Organizational Psychology, Society for Community Research and Action, and Division of Population and Environmental Psychology. He was president of the last-mentioned division in 1985–1986. He is a Charter Member Emeritus and Fellow of the Association for Psychological Science. Wicker has held Fulbright appointments in Zimbabwe (1989), Ghana (1993), Malaysia (1997), and Japan (2009). His Working in Ghana project, which documents the work lives of more than 50 Ghanaian and expatriate workers, grew out of the Ghana appointment (see External Links below).

== Selected publications ==
=== Book ===
Wicker, A. W. (1984). An introduction to ecological psychology. New York: Cambridge University Press. (Original work published 1979)

=== Chapters and articles in Ecological Psychology ===
- Wicker, A. W. (1987). Behavior settings reconsidered: Temporal stages, resources, internal dynamics, context. In D. Stokols & I. Altman (Eds.), Handbook of environmental psychology (Vol. 1, pp. 613–654). New York: Wiley.
- Wicker, A. W. (1992). Making sense of environments. In W. B. Walsh, K. H. Craik, & R. H. Price (Eds.), Person-environment psychology: Models and perspectives (pp. 157–192). Hillsdale, NJ: Erlbaum.
- Wicker, A. W. (2002). Ecological psychology: Historical contexts, current conception, prospective directions. In R. B. Bechtel & A. Churchman, Handbook of environmental psychology (pp. 114–126). New York: Wiley.
- Wicker, A. W. (2011) Toward a pragmatic ecological psychology. "MERA Journal, 14(1)," 11–17.
- Wicker, A. W. (2012). Perspectives on behavior settings: With illustrations from Allison's ethnography of a Japanese hostess club. Environment and Behavior, 44, 474–492.
- Wicker, A. W., & August, R. A. (2000). Working lives in context: Engaging the views of participants and analysts. In W. B. Walsh, K. H. Craik, & R. H. Price. Person-environment psychology: New directions and perspectives (2nd ed., pp. 197–232). Hillsdale, NJ: Erlbaum.
- Wicker, A. W., & King, J. C. (1988). Life cycles of behavior settings. In J. E. E.McGrath (Ed.), The social psychology of time. (pp. 182–200). Newbury Park, CA: Sage.

=== Articles in Social Psychology ===
- Wicker, A. W. (1969). Attitudes versus actions: The relationship of verbal and overt behavioral responses to attitude objects. Journal of Social Issues, 25(4), 41–78. Available online at http://www.thecre.com/tpsac/wp-content/uploads/2011/02/Appendix1_AttitudevsAction_ByWicker1969.pdf
- Wicker, A. W. (1971). An examination of the "other variables" explanation of attitude behavior inconsistency. Journal of Personality and Social Psychology, 19, 18–30.

=== Other articles ===
- Wicker, A. W. (1989). Substantive theorizing. American Journal of Community Psychology, 17, 531–547.
- Wicker, A. W. (1985). Getting out of our conceptual ruts: Strategies for expanding conceptual frameworks. American Psychologist, 40, 1094–1103. Available online at http://www.internal.psychology.illinois.edu/~broberts/Wicker,%201985.pdf

== See also ==
- Ecological psychology
- Environmental psychology
