= Barriers to pro-environmental behaviour =

Pro-environmental behaviour is behaviour that people consciously choose in order to minimize the negative impact of their actions on the environment. Barriers to pro-environmental behaviour are the numerous factors that hinder individuals when they try to adjust their behaviours toward living more sustainable lifestyles.

Generally, these barriers can be separated into larger categories: psychological, social/cultural, financial and structural. Psychological barriers are considered internal, where an individual's knowledge, beliefs and thoughts affect their behaviour. Social and cultural barriers are contextual, where an individual's behaviour is affected by their surroundings (e.g. neighbourhood, town, city, etc.). Financial barriers are simply a lack of funds to move toward more sustainable behaviour (e.g. new technologies, electric cars). Structural barriers are external and often impossible for an individual to control, such as lack of governmental action, or locality of residence that promotes car dependency as opposed to public transit.

== Internal/psychological barriers ==
Identifying psychological barriers to pro-environmental behaviour is key to the design of successful behaviour change interventions. Scholars have identified several different categories of psychological barriers to pro-environmental action. A known researcher in the field, environmental psychologist Robert Gifford, has identified 33 of these barriers, barriers that he has termed "The Dragons of Inaction." The Dragons are separated into seven categories: Limited Cognition, Ideologies, Social Comparison, Sunk Costs, Discredence, Perceived Risks, and Limited Behaviour. Below are the seven categories, integrated with additional barriers identified by other researchers. Other psychologists have argued that the attempt to identify psychological barriers to environmental behavior is problematic when used to explain societal inaction on climate change.

=== Limited cognition ===
Limited cognition barriers are barriers that arise from a lack of knowledge and awareness about environmental issues. For example, with a key environmental issue like climate change, a person might not engage in pro-environmental behaviour because they are: unaware that climate change is occurring; or aware that climate change is an issue, but are ill-informed about the science of climate change; or lacking information about how they could address the issue.

For those who are aware of current environmental issues, self-efficacy is an important barrier to action, where individuals often feel powerless in achieving large goals such as mitigating global climate change. Moreover, lack of motivation to change one's behaviour is correlated with the belief that individuals are incapable of performing effective pro-environmental actions.

=== Ideologies ===
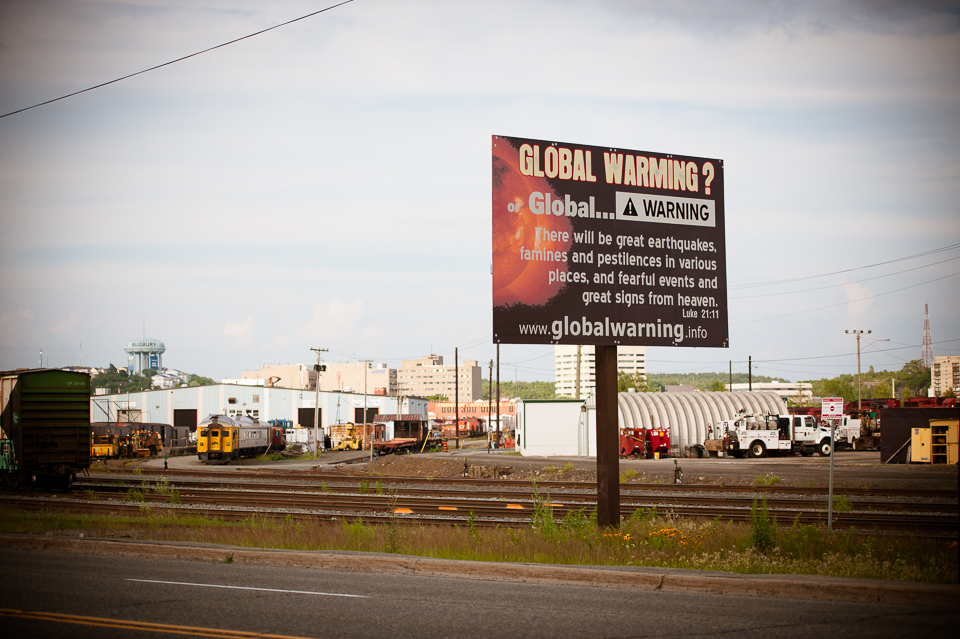
Climate denial billboard

Ideological barriers are created by pre-conceived ideas and the way an individual thinks about the world. Ideologies that can create barriers to pro-environmental behaviour can include a strong belief in free-enterprise capitalism, a fatalistic belief that a higher power is in control, and a belief that technology can solve all environmental issues. Accordingly, tactics such as environmental policies have prompted a tendency to struggle against perceived threats to one's freedom and comfortable lifestyle. This barrier is namely present in Western countries where individuals enjoy comparatively high levels of objective and subjective wellbeing due to socioeconomic status. It has been noted that to live within environmental limits, there is a need to make changes to the comfortable aspects of Western lifestyles, for example, reducing meat consumption, the use of airplanes, and use of electronic gadgets with short life-spans. Western cultural norms associate meat consumption with wealth, status and luxury, and meat consumption per capita in the richest 15 nations of the world is 750% higher than in the poorest 24 nations. A shift in values may be difficult, as people's life goals are formed by their ideas of social progress, personal status, and success through careers, higher incomes and consumption.

Moreover, there exist deep structural and cultural roots that couple the macro-level of financial, property or labour institutions to the micro-level of individualistic, utilitarian values. These roots are linked to the current economic growth paradigm, which can be defined as a worldview that maintains that economic growth is both good and necessary.

=== Social comparison ===
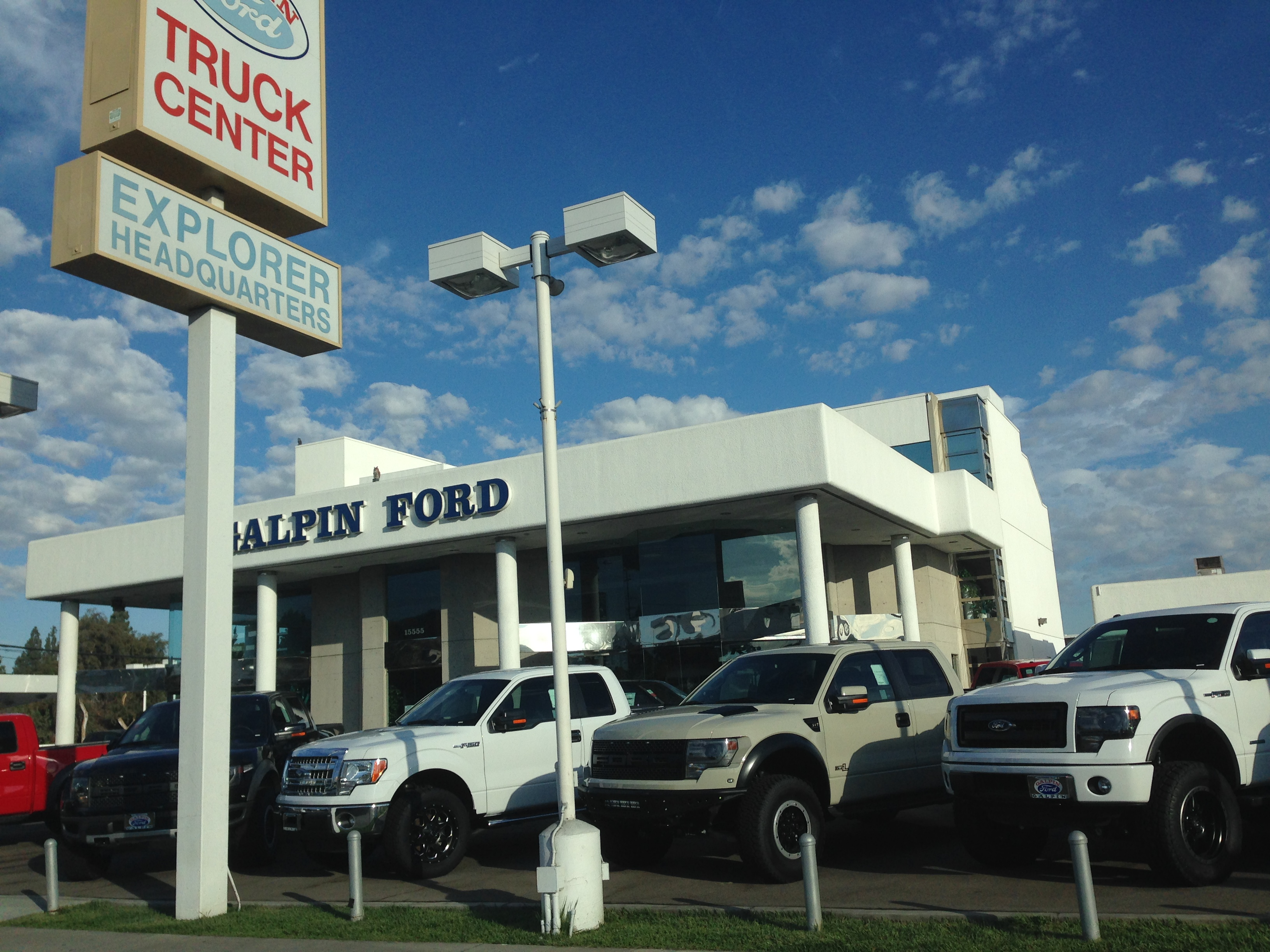
North Hills East truck dealer. The Ford F-150 truck has been the best selling vehicle in the United States for some time achieving less than 30mpg on average.

Social comparison barriers include the comparison of actions with those of others to determine the "correct" behaviour, whether it be beneficial or harmful for the environment. This means that social comparison barriers can also facilitate pro-environmental behaviour. For example, people will alter their energy consumption to replicate the reported usage of their neighbours. Moreover, if individuals believe those around them are not actively engaging in pro-environmental behaviour, they are less likely to engage in it themselves because they believe this to be unfair.

=== Sunk costs ===
Sunk cost barriers are the investments (not necessarily financial) of an individual that in turn restrict alternative possibilities for change, or in this circumstance, for pro-environmental behaviour. One example of a financial investment is car ownership, where the individual will be less likely to use alternative modes of transportation. Habits are considered a Sunk Costs Dragon as well because they are very difficult to change (e.g. eating habits). Individuals are also deeply invested in their life goals and aspirations, even if achieving them will harm the environment. Place attachment is considered here as well, where an individual who feels no place attachment to their home will be less likely to act pro-environmentally in that place than one who loves where they live.

Additional barriers are inconvenience and time-related pressures, which are suggested as reasons why individuals go back to unsustainable habits. An individual may find it annoying and inconvenient to compost if they do not have access to municipal composting, for example, and if one is pressed for time they may choose to use their car rather than wait for public transit.

=== Discredence ===
Discredence barriers generally involve disbelief in environmental issues and/or distrust in government officials and scientists. Complete denial of climate change and other environmental issues is becoming less prominent, but it continues to persist. Skepticism is still apparent in countries where there are efforts to shape public opinion through mediums such as conservative think tanks and media outlets. Moreover, mass media is the primary source of information on climate change in many countries, therefore depending on the individual, they will either trust or ignore the information they receive which will vary from one media outlet to the next based on different views.

Distrust in government has become a prevalent issue recently. In the United States for example, Americans have been polled every year about their confidence in their country's institutions (e.g. the Supreme Court, Congress, the Presidency, and the health-care establishment), and there has been a reported collapse in trust over time (12% in 2017). From an environmental standpoint, the first Trump administration has significantly diminished regulations that were put in place by the former administration to meet environmental standards. Examples of policy changes include pulling out of the Paris Agreement, loosening regulations on toxic air pollution, and issuing an executive order that called for a 30% increase in logging on public lands. There is a 97% scientific consensus on anthropogenic climate change, yet there is still not enough being done to meet global temperature targets of staying below a 1.5 degrees Celsius increase (see Paris Agreement).

Even in a stable constitutional republic, a cynical or unmoored citizenry presents an opportunity for demagogues and populists. As much as stagnant wages in former manufacturing regions, glaring economic inequality, or white backlash after the Obama Presidency, the country's disillusionment with institutions enabled Donald Trump's election.

— The New Yorker

=== Perceived risk ===
Risk perception barriers include worrying about whether financial or temporal investments will pay off. An example of a financial investment is solar panels which are initially costly. A temporal investment can simply be spending the time to do research on the topic instead of doing something else.

There exists the concept of psychological distance, where people tend to discount future risks when making trade-offs between cost and benefits, and instead prioritize immediate day-to-day concerns. Spatial distance allows individuals to disregard any risks, and instead consider them more likely for other people and places than for themselves. This barrier can simply be thought of as "out of sight, out of mind." Additionally, people typically underestimate the likelihood of being affected by natural disasters, as well as the degree to which others are concerned about environmental issues. Furthermore, the human brain privileges experience over analysis: personal experiences with extreme weather events can influence risk perceptions, beliefs, behaviour and policy support, whereas statistical information by itself means very little to most people.

It has been hypothesised many times that no matter how strong the climate knowledge provided by risk analysts, experts and scientists is, risk perception determines agents' ultimate response in terms of mitigation. However, recent literature reports conflicting evidence about the actual impact of risk perception on agents' climate response. Rather, a no-direct perception-response link with the mediation and moderation of many other factors and a strong dependency on the context analysed is shown. Some moderation factors considered as such in the specialised literature include communication and social norms. Yet, conflicting evidence of the disparity between public communication about climate change and the lack of behavioural change has also been observed in the general public. Likewise, doubts are raised about the observance of social norms as an influencing predominant factor that affects action on climate change. What is more, disparate evidence also showed that even agents highly engaged in mitigation (engagement is a mediation factor) actions fail ultimately to respond.

=== Limited behaviour ===
Limited behaviour barriers may include people choosing easier, yet less effective, pro-environmental behavioural changes (e.g. recycling, metal straws), and the rebound effect, which occurs when a positive environmental behaviour is followed by one that negates it (e.g. saving money with an electric car to then buy a plane ticket).

== Contextual barriers ==
=== Social and cultural factors ===
Research has also shown that how people support and engage in pro-environmental behaviour is also affected by contextual factors (i.e. social, economic, and cultural); people with diverse cultural backgrounds have different perspectives and priorities, and thus, they may respond to the same policies and interventions in different ways with regionally differentiated world views playing an important role. This means that people will use different excuses for their behaviours depending on contextual factors. Research has shown that information has a greater impact on behaviour if it is tailored to the personal situations of consumers and resonates with their important values. This suggests that, for example, policies developed to reduce and mitigate climate change would be more effective if they were developed specifically for the people whose behaviour they were targeting.

People are social beings who respond to group norms: behaviour and decision-making has been shown to be affected by social norms and contexts.

Demographic variables like age, gender and education, can have a variety of effects on pro-environmental behaviour, depending on the issue and context. However, when considering the effects of socio-demographics on individual perceptions of climate change, a recent study reported a meta-analysis which found that the largest demographic correlation with the belief of human-caused climate change is political affiliation (e.g. conservative views often mean less support for climate mitigation).

=== Economic factors ===
The cost of sustainable alternatives and financial measures used to support new technologies can also be a barrier to pro-environmental behaviour. Households may have severe budgetary constraints that discourage them from investing in energy-efficient measures. In addition, individuals may fear that project costs will not be recovered prior to a future sale of a property. Economic factors are not just barriers to pro-environmental behaviour for individual households but are also a barrier on the international scale. Developing countries that rely on coal and fossil fuels may not have the funding or infrastructure to switch to more sustainable energy sources. Therefore, help from developed countries, with regards to cost, may be needed. As nations become more prosperous, their citizens are less concerned with the economic battle for survival and are free to pursue postmaterialistic ideals such as political freedom, personal fulfillment, and environmental conservation. In other cases however, environment-friendly behaviours may be undertaken for non-environmental reasons, such as to save money or to improve health (e.g. biking or walking instead of driving).

=== Structural barriers ===
Structural barriers are large-scale systemic barriers that may be perceived as being objective and external, and can be highly influential and near impossible to control, even when one wishes to adopt more pro-environmental behaviour. For example, lack of organizational and governmental action on sustainability is considered a barrier for individuals looking to participate in sustainable practices. Further examples of structural barriers include: low problem awareness at the local level caused by a low priority for adaptation at higher institutional levels, and missing leadership by certain key actors leading to an absence of appropriate decision-making routines. Other structural barriers reported from a Vancouver-based study include: term limits imposed on politicians that affect council's ability to make long-term decisions; budgetary cycles that force planning based on three year terms, rather than long-term planning; and hierarchical systems that inhibit flexibility and innovation.

Research has shown that individuals may not behave in accordance with environmental sustainability when they have little control over the outcome of a situation. An example of a structural choice that can influence an individual's use of high carbon transport, occurs when cities governments allow sprawling neighbourhoods to develop without associated public transit infrastructure.

The concept of barriers has also been defined in relation to adaptive capacity, the ability of a system to respond to environmental changes; a barrier can either be a reason for potential adaptive capacity not being translated into action, or a reason for the existence of low adaptive capacity.

== See also ==
- Climate action – Actions to reduce climate change
- Human impact on the environment – Impact of human life on Earth and environment
- Transit desert – Area lacking in transit
