= Management of schizophrenia =

Methods of managing schizophrenia

- Specialty: Psychiatry

The management of schizophrenia usually involves many aspects including psychological, pharmacological, social, educational, and employment-related interventions directed to recovery, and reducing the impact of schizophrenia on quality of life, social functioning, and longevity.

== Hospitalization ==
Hospitalization may occur with severe episodes of schizophrenia. This can be voluntary or (if mental health legislation allows it) involuntary (called civil or involuntary commitment). Long-term inpatient stays are now less common due to deinstitutionalization, although still occur. Following (or in lieu of) a hospital admission, support services available can include drop-in centers, visits from members of a community mental health team or Assertive Community Treatment team, supported employment and patient-led support groups. Efforts to avoid repeated hospitalization include the obtaining of community treatment orders which, following judicial approval, coerce the affected individual to receive psychiatric treatment including long-acting injections of anti-psychotic medication. This legal mechanism has been shown to increase the affected patient's time out of the hospital.

== Medication ==
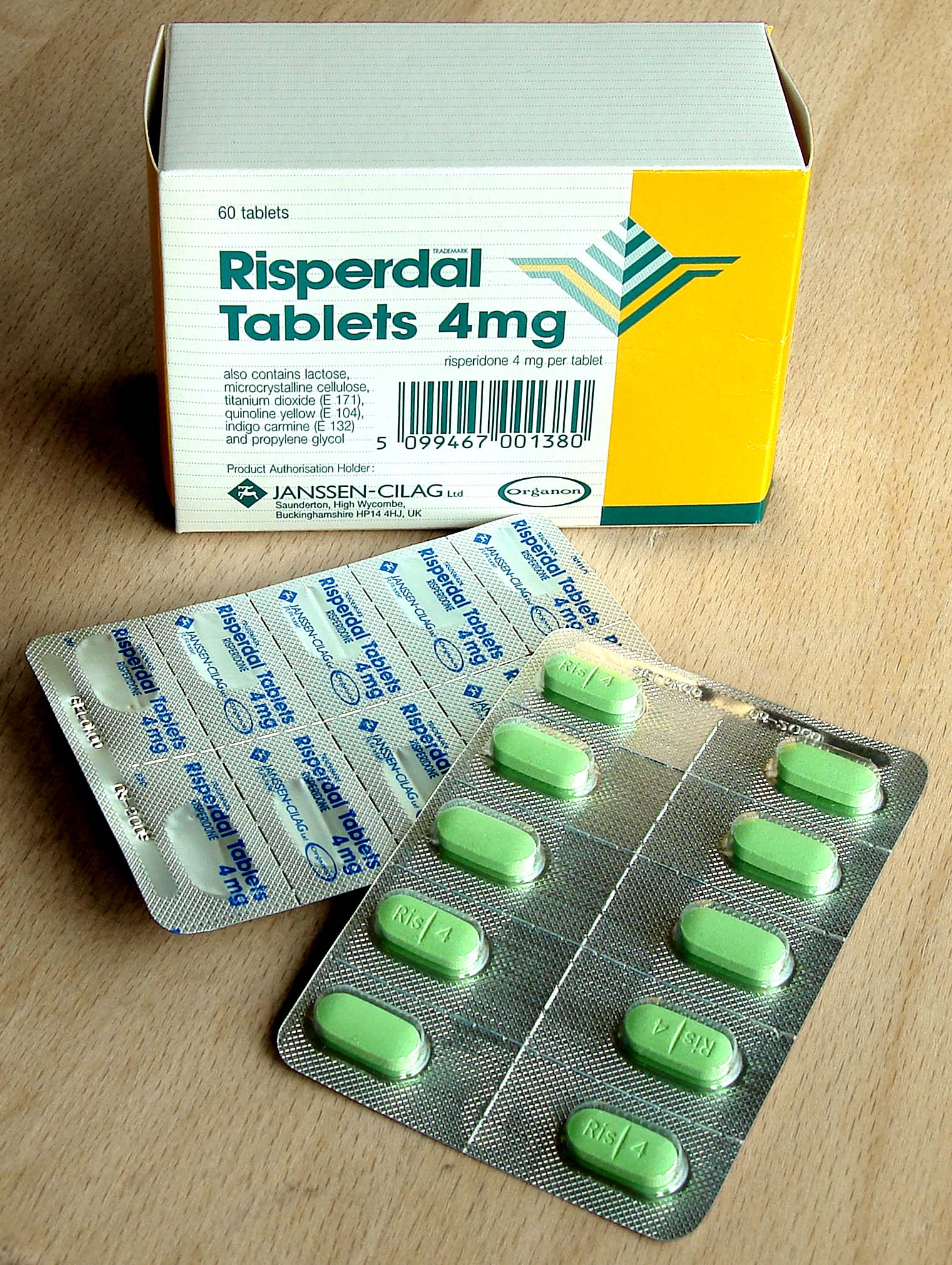
Risperidone (trade name Risperdal) is a common atypical antipsychotic medication.

The mainstay of treatment for schizophrenia is an antipsychotic medication. Most antipsychotics can take around 7 to 14 days to have their full effect. Medication may improve the positive symptoms of schizophrenia, and social and vocational functioning. However, antipsychotics fail to significantly improve the negative symptoms and cognitive dysfunction. There is evidence of clozapine, amisulpride, olanzapine, and risperidone being the most effective medications. However, a high proportion of studies of risperidone were undertaken by its manufacturer, Janssen-Cilag, and should be interpreted with this in mind. In those on antipsychotics, continued use decreases the risk of relapse. There is little evidence regarding consistent benefits from their use beyond two or three years.

Treatment of schizophrenia changed dramatically in the mid-1950s with the development and introduction of the first antipsychotic chlorpromazine. Others such as haloperidol and trifluoperazine soon followed.

It remains unclear whether the newer antipsychotics reduce the chances of developing neuroleptic malignant syndrome, a rare but serious and potentially fatal neurological disorder most often caused by an adverse reaction to antipsychotics (neuroleptics).

Most people on antipsychotics get side effects. People on typical antipsychotics tend to have a higher rate of extrapyramidal side effects while some atypicals are associated with considerable weight gain, diabetes, and risk of metabolic syndrome; this is most pronounced with olanzapine, while risperidone and quetiapine are also associated with weight gain. Risperidone has a similar rate of extrapyramidal symptoms to haloperidol. The American Psychiatric Association generally recommends that atypicals be used as first line treatment in most patients, but further states that therapy should be individually optimized for each patient.

The response of symptoms to medication is variable; treatment resistant schizophrenia is the failure to respond to two or more antipsychotic medications given in therapeutic doses for six weeks or more. Patients in this category may be prescribed clozapine, a medication that may be more effective at reducing symptoms of schizophrenia, but treatment may come with a higher risk of several potentially lethal side effects including agranulocytosis and myocarditis. Clozapine is the only medication proven to be more effective for people who do not respond to other types of antipsychotics. It also appears to reduce suicide in people with schizophrenia. As clozapine suppresses the development of bone marrow, in turn reducing white blood cells which can lead to infection, blood tests are taken for the first six months on this medication. The risk of experiencing agranulocytosis due to clozapine treatment is higher in elderly people, children, and adolescents. The effectiveness in the studies also needs to be interpreted with caution as the studies may have an increased risk of bias.

Studies have found that antipsychotic treatment following NMS and neutropenia may sometimes be successfully rechallenged (restarted) with clozapine.

Tobacco smoking increases the metabolism of some antipsychotics, by strongly activitating CYP1A2, the enzyme that breaks them down, and a significant difference is found in these levels between smokers and non-smokers. It is recommended that the dosage for those smokers on clozapine be increased by 50%, and for those on olanzapine by 30%. The result of stopping smoking can lead to an increased concentration of the antipsychotic that may result in toxicity, so that monitoring of effects would need to take place with a view to decreasing the dosage; many symptoms may be noticeably worsened, and extreme fatigue, and seizures are also possible with a risk of relapse. Likewise those who resume smoking may need their dosages adjusted accordingly. The altering effects are due to compounds in tobacco smoke and not to nicotine; the use of nicotine replacement therapy therefore has the equivalent effect of stopping smoking and monitoring would still be needed.

Research findings suggested that other neurotransmission systems, including serotonin, glutamate, GABA, and acetylcholine, were implicated in the development of schizophrenia, and that a more inclusive medication was needed. A new first-in-class antipsychotic that targets multiple neurotransmitter systems called lumateperone (ITI-007), was trialed and approved by the FDA in December 2019 for the treatment of schizophrenia in adults. Lumateperone is a small molecule agent that shows improved safety, and tolerance. It interacts with dopamine, serotonin, and glutamate in a complex, uniquely selective manner, and is seen to improve negative and positive symptoms, and social functioning. Lumateperone was also found to reduce potential metabolic dysfunction, have lower rates of movement disorders, and have lower cardiovascular side effects such as a fast heart rate.

The fixed-dose combination medication xanomeline/trospium chloride (Cobenfy) was approved for medical use in the United States in September 2024. It is the first antipsychotic drug approved by the US Food and Drug Administration (FDA) to treat schizophrenia that targets cholinergic receptors as opposed to dopamine receptors, which has long been the standard of care.

=== Add-on agents ===
Sometimes the use of a second antipsychotic in combination with another is recommended where there has been a poor response. A review of this use found some evidence for an improvement in symptoms but not for relapse or hospitalisation. The use of combination antipsychotics is increasing in spite of limited supporting evidence, with some countries including Finland, France, and the UK recommending its use and others including Canada, Denmark, and Spain in opposition. Anti-inflammatories, anti-depressants, and mood stabilisers are other add-ons used. Other strategies used include ECT, or repetitive transcranial magnetic stimulation (rTMS) but evidence for these is lacking.

Note: Only adjuncts for which at least one double-blind randomized placebo-controlled trial has provided support are listed in this table.

| Adjuncts | Symptoms against which efficacy is known | Notable adverse effects seen in clinical trials | Highest quality of clinical data available | N | Notes |
|---|---|---|---|---|---|
Adjuncts to clozapine
Antipsychotics
| Amisulpride | Global | Extrapyramidal side effects (e.g. tremor, dystonia, akathisia, etc.), headache, somnolence, insomnia, elevated serum prolactin, etc. | 1 DB-RPCTs | 16 | Not approved for use in the US or Canada. Approved for use in Australia, Europe and several countries in East Asia. Can prolong the QT interval, some in vivo evidence suggests it may have anti-diabetogenic effects and hence may improve metabolic parameters in patients on clozapine. |
| Aripiprazole | Global, esp. negative | Akathisia | 1 DB-RPCT | 61 | Can also improve metabolic side effects of clozapine (including body weight). Six studies so far; only one negative. |
| Risperidone | Global | Impaired cognitive functioning, prolactin elevation and hyperglycaemia | 2 DB-RPCTs, 1 DB-RCT | 357 (DB-RPCTs) & 24 (DB-RCT) | 11 studies have been conducted, 5 negative. A meta-analysis found no clinically significant difference between risperidone augmentation and placebo augmentation. |
| Sulpiride | Global | Increased serum prolactin | 1 DB-RPCT | 28 | Not approved for use in the US, Canada and Australia. |
| Ziprasidone | Global | QTc interval prolongation | 1 DB-RCT | 24 | Was compared with risperidone in the one DB-RCT. |
Antidepressants
| Citalopram | Negative symptoms | Well tolerated | 1 DB-RPCT | 61 | Can prolong the QT interval and since clozapine can prolong the QT interval too it is advisable to avoid their concurrent use in patients with cardiovascular risk factors. |
| Fluvoxamine | Negative and depressive symptoms | Elevated serum levels of clozapine (via inhibition of P450 cytochromes) | Open-label studies | NA | Improved metabolic parameters |
| Mirtazapine | Negative, depressive and cognitive symptoms | Weight gain | 2 DB-RPCTs (1 negative) | 80 | 5-HT_{2A/2C/3} & α_{2} adrenoceptor antagonist |
Anticonvulsants
| Lamotrigine | Negative & depressive symptoms | Stevens–Johnson syndrome, toxic epidermal necrolysis, etc. | 4 DB-RPCTs (2 negative) | 108 | Usually a relatively well tolerated anticonvulsant, but because of risk of potentially-fatal dermatologic AEs the dose must be slowly titrated up in order to prevent these AEs. A meta-analysis found that it was ineffective. |
| Topiramate | Negative symptoms | Cognitive impairment, sedation, asthenia | 2 DB-RPCTs (1 negative) | 57 | Can cause cognitive impairment and hence should probably be avoided in patients with cognitive impairments. |
| Valproate | Reduced anxiety & depression | Weight gain, hair loss | One open-label study comparing it with lithium | NA | Increases the expression of mGluR2 and GAD67 via histone deacetylase (HDAC) inhibition. |
Glutamatergic agents
| CX-516 | Global | Well tolerated | 1 DB-RPCT | 18 | Statistically significant improvement in total symptoms but no significant improvement in negative and positive symptoms when considered separately. |
| Memantine | Global | Well tolerated | 1 DB-RPCT | 21 | Statistically significant improvement in negative and total symptomtology. |
Other
| Lithium | Global | Weight gain, hypersalivation | 1 DB-RPCT, 1 DB-RCT | 10 (DB-RPCT), 20 (DB-RCT) | Increased risk of neurological side effects such as neuroleptic malignant syndrome. |
| E-EPA | Global (especially negative and cognitive symptoms) | Well tolerated | 3 DB-RPCT (1 negative) | 131 | Ester of the omega-3 fatty acid, eicosapentaenoic acid. |
Adjuncts to other antipsychotics
Anti-inflammatory agents
| Aspirin | Global (especially positive symptoms) | Well tolerated | 1 DB-RPCT | 70 | Increased risk of bleeding, but seems relatively well tolerated. |
| Celecoxib | Global (especially negative symptoms) | Well tolerated | 3 DB-RPCTs (1 negative) | 147 | May increased the risk of cardiovascular events (which is particularly worrisome as schizophrenia patients are a higher risk group for cardiovascular events). Case series (N=2) suggests efficacy in augmenting clozapine. |
| Minocycline | Global | Well tolerated | 4 DB-RPCTs | 164 | Increased risk of blood dyscarsias. |
| Omega-3 fatty acids | Global | Well tolerated | 6 DB-RPCTs (1 negative) | 362 | May have protective effects against depression. |
| Pregnenolone | Global | Well tolerated | 3 DB-RPCTs | 100 | Levels of this neurosteroid in the body are elevated by clozapine treatment. |
Glutamatergics
| D-alanine | Global | Well tolerated | 1 DB-RPCT | 31 | A D-amino acid with affinity towards the glycine site on the NMDA receptor. |
| D-serine | Global (especially negative symptoms) | Well tolerated | 4 DB-RPCTs | 183 | Affinity towards the glycine site on NMDA receptors. D. Souza 2013, Heresco-Levy 2005, Lane 2005, Lane 2010, Tsai 1999, Weiser 2012 |
| Glycine | Global (predominantly positive symptoms) | Well tolerated | 5 DB-RPCTs | 219 | Endogenous NMDA receptor ligand. |
| N-acetylcysteine | Global (especially negative symptoms) | Well tolerated | 3 DB-RPCTs | 140 | Cystine and glutathione prodrug. Cystine increases intracellular glutamate levels via the glutamate-cystine anti porter. Berk 2008, Berk 2011, Carmeli 2012, Lavoie 2008 |
| Sarcosine | Global (especially negative symptoms) | Well tolerated | 3 DB-RPCTs | 112 | GlyT1 antagonist (i.e. glycine reuptake inhibitor). Also known as N-methylglycine. Lane 2005, Lane 2006, Lane 2008, Lane 2010, Tsai 2004 |
Cholinergics
| Donepezil | Global | Well tolerated | 6 DB-RPCTs (5 negative; or 12 DB-RPCTs if one includes cross-over trials; 8 negative in total) | 378, 474 (including cross-over trials) | Possesses antidepressant effects according to one trial. |
| Galantamine | Cognition | Well tolerated | 5 DB-RPCTs (1 negative) | 170 | Robust nootropic |
| Rivastigmine | Cognition | Well tolerated | 3 DB-RPCTs (all 3 negative; 5 trials including cross-over trials; 4 negative) | 93, 131 (including cross-over trials) | Seems to be a weaker nootropic |
| Tropisetron† | Cognitive and negative symptoms | Well tolerated | 3 DB-RPCTs | 120 | Agonist at α_{7} nAChRs; antagonist at 5-HT_{3}. Expensive (>$20 AUD/tablet). |
Antidepressants
| Escitalopram† | Negative symptoms | Well tolerated | 1 DB-RPCT | 40 | May increase risk of QT interval prolongation. |
| Fluoxetine | Negative symptoms | Well tolerated | 4 DB-RPCTs (3 negative) | 136 | The safest of antidepressants listed here in overdose. Risk of QT interval prolongation is lower than with escitalopram (but still exists). |
| Mianserin | Negative and cognitive symptoms | Well tolerated | 2 DB-RPCTs | 48 | Weight gain, sedation, dry mouth, constipation and dizziness. Blood dyscarsias are a possible adverse effect and both the Australian Medicines Handbook and British National Formulary 65 (BNF 65) recommend regular complete blood counts to be taken. |
| Mirtazapine | Cognition, negative and positive symptoms† | Well tolerated | ≥4 DB-RPCTs (one negative) | 127 | Relatively safe in overdose. Produces significant sedation and weight gain, however, which could potentially add to the adverse effects of atypical antipsychotics. Can reduce antipsychotic-induced akathisia. |
| Ritanserin | Negative symptoms | Well tolerated | 2 DB-RPCTs | 73 | 5-HT_{2A/2C} antagonist. Not clinically available. |
| Trazodone | Negative symptoms | Well tolerated | 2 DB-RPCTs | 72 | 5-HT_{2A} antagonist and SSRI. Has sedative effects and hence might exacerbate some of the side effects of atypical antipsychotics. |
Other
| Alpha-lipoic acid | Weight gain | Well tolerated | 1 DB-RPCT | 360 | Offset antipsychotic drug-induced weight gain. Increased total antioxidant status. May also increase GSH:GSSG (reduced glutathione:oxidized glutathione) ratio. |
| L-Theanine | Positive, activation, and anxiety symptoms | Well tolerated | 2 DB-RPCTs | 40 | Glutamic acid analog. Primary study noted reduction in positive, activation, and anxiety symptoms. Additional studies have noted improvements in attention. Research suggests that theanine has a regulatory effect on the nicotine acetylcholine receptor-dopamine reward pathway, and was shown to reduced dopamine production in the midbrain of mice. |
| Famotidine† | Global | Well tolerated | 1 DB-RPCT | 30 | May reduce the absorption of vitamin B12 from the stomach. Might also increase susceptibility to food poisoning. |
| Ginkgo biloba | Tardive dyskinesia, positive symptoms | Well tolerated | 4 DB-RPCTs | 157 | Atmaca 2005, Doruk 2008, Zhang 2001, Zhang 2001, Zhang 2006, Zhang 2011, Zhou 1999 |
| Ondansetron | Negative and cognitive symptoms | Well tolerated | 3 DB-RPCTs | 151 | 5-HT_{3} antagonist. May prolong the QT interval. Expensive (>$4 AUD/tablet). |
| SAM-e | Aggression | Well tolerated | 1 DB-RPCT | 18 | Study noted improvement of aggressive behavior and quality of life impairment. while in another study SAM-e has been purported to have a contributory effect on psychosis |
| Vitamin C | Global | Well tolerated | 1 DB-RPCT | 40 | Improves BPRS scores. |

Acronyms used:
DB-RPCT — Double-blind randomized placebo-controlled trial.
DB-RCT — Double-blind randomized controlled trial.

Note: Global in the context of schizophrenia symptoms here refers to all four symptom clusters.

N refers to the total sample sizes (including placebo groups) of DB-RCTs.

† No secondary sources could be found on the utility of the drug in question, treating the symptom in question (or any symptom in the case of where † has been placed next to the drug's name).

== Psychosocial ==
Psychotherapy is also widely recommended, though not widely used in the treatment of schizophrenia, due to reimbursement problems or lack of training. As a result, treatment is often confined to psychiatric medication.

Cognitive behavioral therapy (CBT) is used to target specific symptoms and improve related issues such as self-esteem and social functioning. Although the results of early trials were inconclusive as the therapy advanced from its initial applications in the mid-1990s, meta-analytic reviews suggested CBT to be an effective treatment for the psychotic symptoms of schizophrenia. Nonetheless, more recent meta analyses have cast doubt upon the utility of CBT as a treatment for the symptoms of psychosis.

Another approach is cognitive remediation therapy, a technique aimed at remediating the neurocognitive deficits sometimes present in schizophrenia. Based on techniques of neuropsychological rehabilitation, early evidence has shown it to be cognitively effective, resulting in the improvement of previous deficits in psychomotor speed, verbal memory, nonverbal memory, and executive function, such improvements being related to measurable changes in brain activation as measured by fMRI.

Metacognitive training (MCT): In view of many empirical findings suggesting deficits of metacognition (thinking about one's thinking, reflecting upon one's cognitive process) in patients with schizophrenia, metacognitive training (MCT) is increasingly adopted as a complementary treatment approach. MCT aims at sharpening the awareness of patients for a variety of cognitive biases (e.g. jumping to conclusions, attributional biases, over-confidence in errors), which are implicated in the formation and maintenance of schizophrenia positive symptoms (especially delusions), and to ultimately replace these biases with functional cognitive strategies. The training consists of 8 modules and can be obtained cost-free from the internet in 15 languages. Studies confirm the training's feasibility and efficacy in ameliorating positive psychosis symptoms. Studies of single training module show that this intervention target specific cognitive biases. Recently, an individualized format has been developed which combines the metacognitive approach with methods derived from cognitive-behavioral therapy.

Family Therapy or Education, which addresses the whole family system of an individual with a diagnosis of schizophrenia, may be beneficial, at least if the duration of intervention is longer-term. A 2010 Cochrane review concluded that many of the clinical trials that studied the effectiveness of family interventions were poorly designed, and may over estimate the effectiveness of the therapy. High-quality randomized controlled trials in this area are required. Aside from therapy, the impact of schizophrenia on families and the burden on careers has been recognized, with the increasing availability of self-help books on the subject. There is also some evidence for benefits from social skills training, although there have also been significant negative findings. Some studies have explored the possible benefits of music therapy and other creative therapies.

The Soteria model is alternative to inpatient hospitalization using full non professional care and a minimal medication approach. Although evidence is limited, a review found the program equally as effective as treatment with medications but due to the limited evidence did not recommend it as a standard treatment. Training in the detection of subtle facial expressions has been used to improve facial emotional recognition.

Avatar Therapy, developed by Professor Julian Leff, was developed to help patients deal with the impact of auditory hallucinations. In this therapy, patients engage in real-time, face-to-face dialogue with a digital avatar that represents the voice they hear. The therapist operates the avatar, allowing it to verbally communicate with the patient in a controlled and safe environment. Over time, the patient learns to confront and reduce the power of the hallucination, often finding relief from its intensity and frequency. AVATAR therapy aims to help patients gain control over their symptoms, reduce distress, and improve overall mental health. This therapy is grounded in the idea that giving a "face" and voice to auditory hallucinations can help individuals reframe their relationship with these experiences. AVATAR therapy has shown promising results in clinical trials, demonstrating improvements in reducing the impact of auditory hallucinations compared to standard treatment options. A 2020 Cochrane review however failed to find any consistent effects in the reviewed studies.

=== Supplements ===
Disruption of the gut microbiota has been linked to inflammation, and disorders of the central nervous system. This includes schizophrenia, and probiotic supplementation has been proposed to improve its symptoms. A review found no evidence to support this but it concludes that probiotics may be of benefit in regulating bowel movements and lessening the metabolic effects of antipsychotics.

A review explains the need for an optimal level of vitamin D and omega-3 fatty acids for the proper synthesis and control of the neurotransmitter serotonin. Serotonin regulates executive function, sensory gating, and social behavior – all of which are commonly impaired in schizophrenia. The model proposed suggests that supplementation would help in preventing and treating these brain dysfunctions. Another review finds that omega-3 fatty acids and vitamin D are among the nutritional factors known to have a beneficial effect on mental health. A Cochrane review found evidence to suggest that the use of omega-3 fatty acids in the prodromal stage may prevent the transition to psychosis but the evidence was poor quality and further studies were called for.

==== Treatment resistant schizophrenia ====
About half of those with schizophrenia will respond favourably to antipsychotics, and have a good return of functioning. However, positive symptoms persist in up to a third of people. Following two trials of different antipsychotics over six weeks, that also prove ineffective, they will be classed as having treatment resistant schizophrenia (TRS), and clozapine will be offered. Clozapine is of benefit to around half of this group although it has the potentially serious side effect of agranulocytosis (lowered white blood cell count) in less than 4% of people. Between 12 and 20 per cent will not respond to clozapine and this group is said to have ultra treatment resistant schizophrenia. ECT may be offered to treat TRS as an add-on therapy, and is shown to sometimes be of benefit. A review concluded that this use only has an effect on medium-term TRS and that there is not enough evidence to support its use other than for this group.

TRS is often accompanied by a low quality of life, and greater social dysfunction. TRS may be the result of inadequate rather than inefficient treatment; it also may be a false label due to medication not being taken regularly, or at all. About 16 per cent of people who had initially been responsive to treatment later develop resistance. This could relate to the length of time on APs, with treatment becoming less responsive. This finding also supports the involvement of dopamine in the development of schizophrenia. Studies suggest that TRS may be a more heritable form.

TRS may be evident from first episode psychosis, or from a relapse. It can vary in its intensity and response to other therapies. This variation is seen to possibly indicate an underlying neurobiology such as dopamine supersensitivity (DSS), glutamate or serotonin dysfunction, inflammation and oxidative stress. Studies have found that dopamine supersensitivity is found in up to 70% of those with TRS. The variation has led to the suggestion that treatment responsive and treatment resistant schizophrenia be considered as two different subtypes. It is further suggested that if the subtypes could be distinguished at an early stage significant implications could follow for treatment considerations, and for research. Neuroimaging studies have found a significant decrease in the volume of grey matter in those with TRS with no such change seen in those who are treatment responsive. In those with ultra treatment resistance the decrease in grey matter volume was larger.

== Rehabilitative interventions ==
Individual Placement and Support (IPS), where the rehabilitated person is directly placed and supported in the workplace with the support of a professional, promotes the employment of people with schizophrenia and their survival in the open labour market better than the model of gradual work practice before placement.

Research evidence on the relative superiority of different types of housing units for people with psychosis in terms of symptomatic or functional development is scarce. The support and independence provided in a residential unit should be flexible, individualised and, as far as possible, at the choice of the person being rehabilitated. The living environment should be as normal as possible and the rehabilitated person should not be isolated from the rest of the community.

== Traditional Chinese medicine ==
Acupuncture is a procedure generally known to be safe and with few adverse effects. A Cochrane review found limited evidence for its possible antipsychotic effects in the treatment of schizophrenia and called for more studies. Another review found limited evidence for its use as an add-on therapy for the relief of symptoms but positive results were found for the treatment of sleep disorders that often accompany schizophrenia.

Wendan decoction is a classic herbal treatment in traditional Chinese medicine used for symptoms of psychosis, and other conditions. Wendan decoction is safe, accessible, and inexpensive, and a Cochrane review was carried out for its possible effects on schizophrenia symptoms. Limited evidence was found for its positive antipsychotic effects in the short term, and it was associated with fewer adverse effects. Used as an add-on to an antipsychotic, wider positive effects were found. Larger studies of improved quality were called for.

== Other ==
Various brain stimulation techniques have been used to treat the positive symptoms of schizophrenia, in particular auditory verbal hallucinations (AVHs), and investigations are ongoing. Most studies focus on transcranial direct-current stimulation (tDCM), and repetitive transcranial magnetic stimulation (rTMS). Transcranial magnetic stimulation is low-cost, noninvasive, and almost free of side-effects making it a good therapeutic choice with promising outcomes. Low-frequency TMS of the left temporoparietal cortex (the region containing Broca's area) can reduce auditory hallucinations. rTMS seems to be the most effective treatment for those with persistent AVHs, as an add-on therapy. AVHs are not resolved in up to 30 per cent of those on antipsychotics and a further percentage still experience only a partial response. Techniques based on focused ultrasound for deep brain stimulation could provide insight for the treatment of AVHs.

An established brain stimulation treatment is electroconvulsive therapy. This is not considered a first-line treatment but may be prescribed in cases where other treatments have failed. It is more effective where symptoms of catatonia are present, and is recommended for use under NICE guidelines in the UK for catatonia if previously effective, though there is no recommendation for use for schizophrenia otherwise. Psychosurgery has now become a rare procedure and is not a recommended treatment for schizophrenia.

There may be some benefit in trying several treatment modalities at the same time, especially those that could be classed as lifestyle interventions. Nidotherapy is suggested to be a cost-effective social prescribing intervention using efforts to change the environment to improve functional ability.

Numerous people diagnosed with schizophrenia have found it necessary to organize confidential groups with each other where they can discuss their experiences without clinicians present. Peer support in which people with experiential knowledge of mental illness provide knowledge, experience, emotional, social or practical help to each other is considered an important aspect of coping with schizophrenia and other serious mental health conditions. A 2019 Cochrane reviews of evidence for peer-support interventions compared to supportive or psychosocial interventions were unable to support or refute the effectiveness of peer-support due to limited data.

== See also ==
- List of investigational antipsychotics
