= Ecopsychology =

Psychological relationship between humans and the natural world

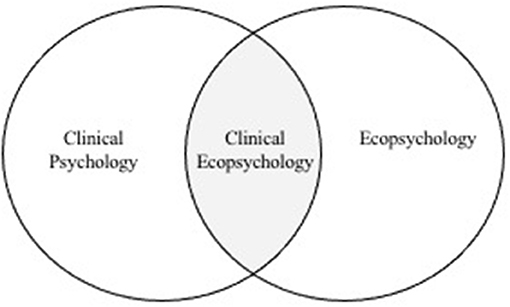
Placement of clinical ecopsychology between clinical psychology and ecopsychology

Ecopsychology is an interdisciplinary and transdisciplinary field that focuses on the synthesis of ecology and psychology and the promotion of sustainability. It is distinguished from conventional psychology as it focuses on studying the emotional bond between humans and the Earth. Instead of examining personal pain solely in the context of individual or family pathology, it is analyzed in its wider connection to the more-than-human world. A central premise is that while the mind is shaped by the modern world, its underlying structure was created in a natural non-human environment. Ecopsychology seeks to expand and remedy the emotional connection between humans and nature, treating people psychologically by bringing them spiritually closer to nature.

== History ==
=== Origins of ecopsychology ===
==== Sigmund Freud ====
In his 1929 book Civilization and Its Discontents ("Das Unbehagen in der Kultur"), Sigmund Freud discussed the basic tensions between civilization and the individual. He recognized the interconnection between the internal world of the mind and the external world of the environment, stating:

Our present ego-feeling is, therefore, only a shrunken residue of a much more inclusive—indeed, an all-embracing—feeling which corresponded to a more intimate bond between the ego and the world about it.

==== Robert Greenway ====
Influenced by the philosophies of noted ecologists Walles T. Edmondson and Loren Eiseley, Robert Greenway began researching and developing a concept that he described as "a marriage" between psychology and ecology in the early 1960s. He theorized that "the mind is nature, and nature, the mind," and called its study psychoecology. Greenway published his first essay on the topic at Brandeis University in 1963.

In 1969, he began teaching the subject at Sonoma State University. One of Greenway's students founded a psychoecology study group at University of California, Berkeley, which was joined by Theodore Roszak in the 1990s.

In the 1995 book Ecopsychology: Restoring the Earth, Healing the Mind, Greenway wrote:

Ecopsychology is a search for language to describe the human-nature relationship. It is a tool for better understanding the relationship, for diagnosing what is wrong with that relationship, and for suggesting paths to healing.

==== Theodore Roszak ====
Theodore Roszak is credited with coining the term "ecopsychology" in his 1992 book The Voice of the Earth, although a group of psychologists and environmentalists, including Mary Gomes and Allen Kanner, were independently using the term at the same time. Roszak, Gomes and Kanner later expanded the idea in the 1995 anthology Ecopsychology. Two other books were especially formative, Paul Shepard's 1982 volume, Nature and Madness, which explored the effect that our diminishing engagement with nature had upon psychological development, and David Abram's 1996 The Spell of the Sensuous: Perception and Language in a More-than-Human World. The latter was one of the first books to bring phenomenology fully to bear on ecological issues, looking closely at the cosmo-vision (or the traditional ecological knowledge systems) of diverse indigenous, oral cultures, and analyzing the curious effect that the advent of formal writing systems, like the phonetic alphabet, has had upon the human experience of the more-than-human natural world. Roszak mentions the biophilia hypothesis of biologist E.O. Wilson; that humans have an instinct to emotionally connect with nature.

== Beliefs ==
Ecopsychology examines the psychological dimensions of the human–nature relationship, including factors that contribute to environmentally damaging behavior and approaches for fostering more sustainable attitudes and behaviors. While focusing on human experiences and behavior in relation to the natural environment, some ecopsychological perspectives emphasize the intrinsic value of deep ecology and the importance of nature connectedness.

=== Fundamental principles ===
Roszak argues that restoring a sense of connection between humans and nature is associated with psychological wellbeing and a sense of personal and ecological integration. According to Roszak, some of the principles of ecopsychology are:

- "There is a synergistic interplay between planetary and personal well-being."
- "The core of the mind is the ecological unconscious."
- "The goal of ecopsychology is to awaken the inherent sense of environmental reciprocity that lies within the ecological unconscious."
- "The contents of the ecological unconscious represent ... the living record of evolution."
- "The crucial stage of development is the life of the child."
- "The ecological ego matures toward a sense of ethical responsibility with the planet."
- "Whatever contributes to small scale social forms and personal empowerment nourish the ecological ego."

== See also ==
- Conservation psychology
- Eco-anxiety
- Ecological empathy
- Ecological grief
- Ecospirituality
- Environmental psychology
- Exercise prescription
- Nature connectedness
