= Ecological Psychology (journal) =

- Discipline: Ecological psychology
- Language: English
- Edited by: Richard Schmidt

Publication details
- History: 1989–present
- Publisher: Taylor & Francis
- Frequency: Quarterly
- Impact factor: 1.227 (2016)

Standard abbreviations
- ISO 4: Ecol. Psychol.

Indexing
- ISSN: 1040-7413 (print); 1532-6969 (web)
- LCCN: 2001214510
- OCLC no.: 226118473

Links
- Journal homepage; Online access; Online archive

Ecological Psychology is a quarterly peer-reviewed academic journal covering ecological psychology. It was established in 1989 and is published by Taylor & Francis. It is the official journal of the International Society for Ecological Psychology. The editor-in-chief since 2020 has been is Michael J. Richardson (Macquarie University, Sydney, Australia). According to the Journal Citation Reports, the journal has a current 5-year impact factor of 2.4, with a 5-year ranking average of 62 out of 152 journals in the category "Psychology, Experimental". Its major focus is on problems of perception, action, cognition, communication, learning, development, behavioural dynamics, and evolution in all species, to the extent that those problems are related to whole animal-environment systems. Human experimental psychology, developmental/social psychology, animal behavior, human factors, fine arts, communication, computer science, philosophy, physical education and therapy, speech, etc., can be considered as significant contributors.
