= Climate action =

Actions to reduce climate change

Climate action (or climate change action) refers to a range of activities, mechanisms, policy instruments, and so forth that aim at reducing the severity of human-induced climate change and its impacts. "More climate action" is a central demand of the climate movement. Climate inaction is the absence of climate action.

== Examples ==
Some examples of climate action include:

- Business action on climate change
- Climate change adaptation
- Climate change mitigation
- Climate finance
- Climate movement, actions by non-governmental organizations
- Fossil fuel divestment
- Individual action on climate change
- Methane leak mitigation
- Politics of climate change
- Radical environmentalism

== Obstacles ==
=== Human behaviour ===
- Barriers to pro-environmental behaviour
- Climate change denial
- Greenwashing
- Media coverage of climate change
- Psychology of climate change denial

== See also ==
- Greenhouse effect
- Causes of climate change
- Effects of climate change
- Ecocide
- Kyoto Protocol
- Paris Agreement
- Sustainable Development Goal 13
- Montreal Protocol, a successful international initiative to protect the ozone layer
- List of environmental organizations
- Category:Climate change organizations
