= Linda Steg =

Dutch university teacher (born 1965)

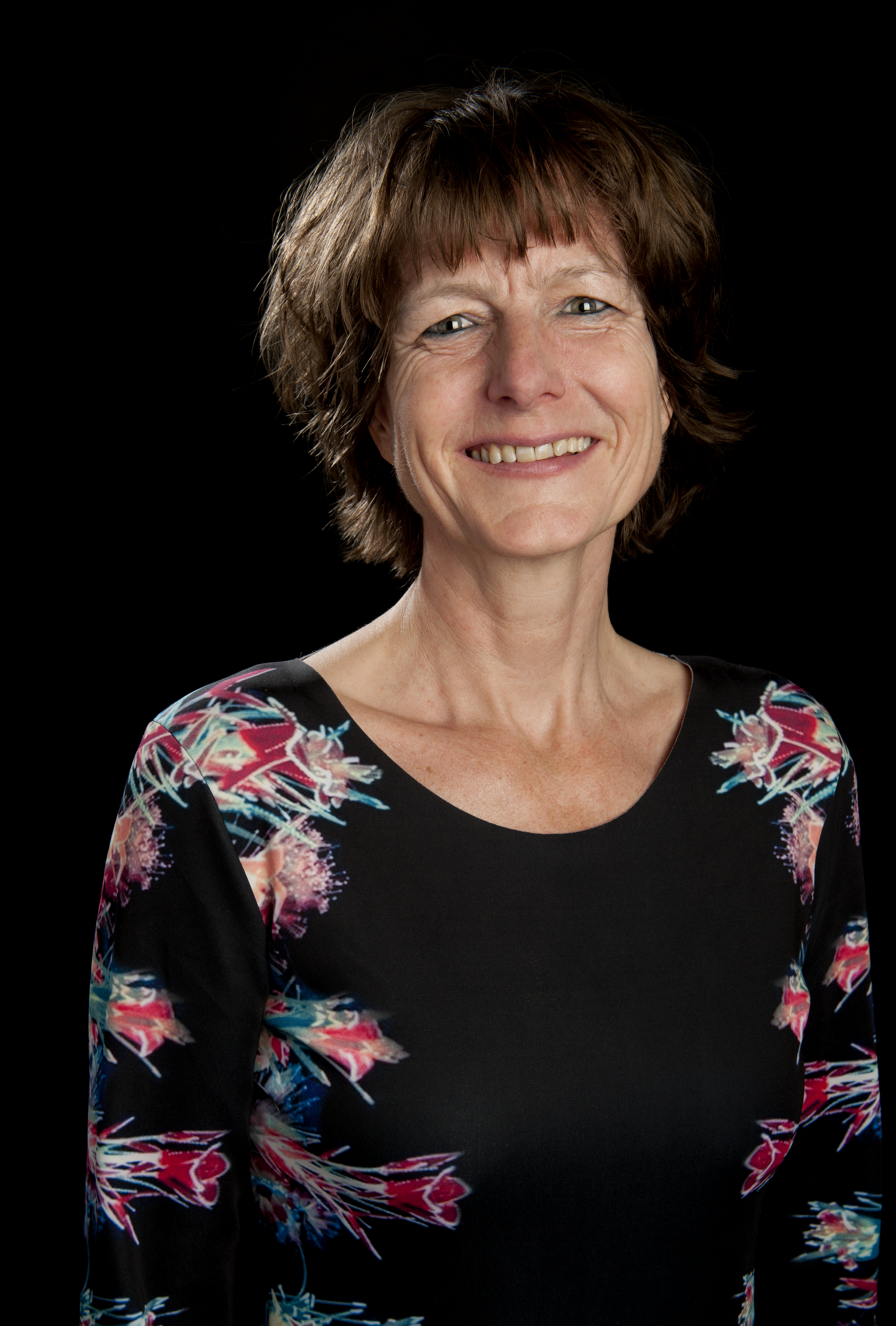
- Born: 1965 (age 60–61)
- Education: University of Groningen
- Scientific career
- Workplaces: University of Groningen
- Thesis: Gedragsverandering ter vermindering van het autogebruik : theoretische analyse en empirische studie over probleembesef, verminderingsbereidheid en beoordeling van beleidsmaatregelen (1996)

Linda Steg (born 1965) is a Dutch psychologist who is Professor of Environmental Psychology at the University of Groningen. She studies the interaction between people and their environment and how people influence their local ecosystems. She was awarded the 2020 Dutch Research Council Stevin Prize.

== Early life and education ==
Steg was born in Ooststellingwerf. She studied adult education at the University of Groningen, remaining there for doctoral research, where she studied behaviour surrounding car use. She then worked at the Netherlands Institute for Social Research, where she studied the factors that motivate environmentally friendly behaviour.

== Research and career ==
Steg works in behavioural psychology, looking to understand environmental behaviour including car use, energy consumption in homes, sustainable food and reducing waste. She has sought to understand the personal and situational factors that impact pro-environmental actions. In 2013, she was made Scientific Director of the Kurt Lewin Institute. Steg has united policymakers, non-governmental organizations, companies and consumers, and was the first to highlight that people's intrinsic motivations were key to evaluate acceptance of climate policy.

In 2015, Steg was supported by the European Energy Research Alliance to evaluate public opinion on shale gas. She found that the more strongly people endorsed positive values toward the environment and other people, the more negatively they evaluated gas extraction efforts. She contributed to the Intergovernmental Panel on Climate Change Special Report on Global Warming of 1.5 °C. She stasbished PERSON, a platform that unites social scientists who are researching energy.

== Awards and honours ==
- 2017 Member of the Royal Netherlands Academy of Arts and Sciences
- 2019 Knight of the Order of the Netherlands Lion
- 2020 Stevin Prize

== Selected publications ==
- Steg, Linda; Vlek, Charles (September 2009). "Encouraging pro-environmental behaviour: An integrative review and research agenda". Journal of Environmental Psychology. 29 (3): 309–317. doi:10.1016/j.jenvp.2008.10.004. hdl:11370/7581b727-854c-41c2-a8af-e055e6224240. ISSN 0272-4944. S2CID 9264684.
- Wokje Abrahamse; Linda Steg; Charles Vlek; Talib Rothengatter (September 2005). "A review of intervention studies aimed at household energy conservation". Journal of Environmental Psychology. 25 (3): 273–291. doi:10.1016/j.jenvp.2005.08.002. ISSN 0272-4944. S2CID 15148181. Wikidata Q104894078.
- Steg, Linda (February 2005). "Car use: lust and must. Instrumental, symbolic and affective motives for car use". Transportation Research Part A: Policy and Practice. 39 (2–3): 147–162. Bibcode:2005TRPA...39..147S. doi:10.1016/j.tra.2004.07.001. hdl:11370/af54ff73-7f23-4514-b48d-3d9f9038c4a8. ISSN 0965-8564. S2CID 145778612.
