= Paco Underhill =

Psychologist, author

Paco Underhill is an environmental psychologist, author, and the founder of market research and consulting company Envirosell. He employs the basic idea of environmental psychology, that our surroundings influence our behavior, to find ways of structuring man-made environments to make them conducive to retail purposes.

== Early life and education ==
Underhill lived abroad as a child, as his father was a diplomat. Underhill is a 1975 graduate of Vassar College, Poughkeepsie, New York, United States.

== Published works ==
- Why We Buy: The Science of Shopping
- Call of the Mall: The Geography of Shopping
- What Women Want: The Global Marketplace Turns Female Friendly
