= Robert Gifford (psychologist) =

Canadian psychologist

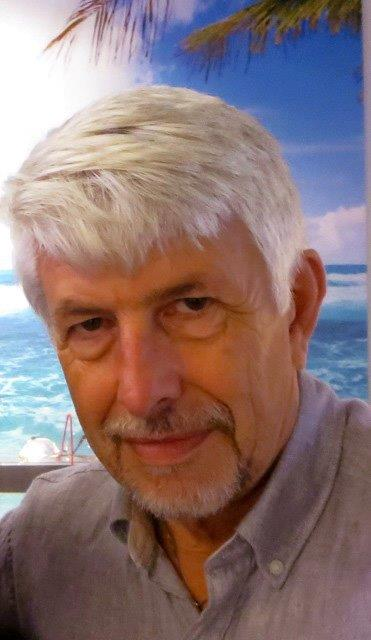
- Education: Simon Fraser University, University of California, Davis
- Scientific career
- Fields: Environmental psychology, social psychology, personality psychology
- Workplaces: University of Victoria
- Academic advisors: Robert Sommer

Robert Gifford was Professor of Psychology and Environmental Studies from 1979 to 2024 at the University of Victoria. His main research interests are environmental psychology, social psychology and personality psychology, including work on nonverbal behavior and climate change behavior barriers. From 2004 to 2016, he was the editor in chief of the Journal of Environmental Psychology. In 2024, the University of Victoria terminated Gifford's employment for sexual harassment of a graduate student.

== Career ==
Gifford received a Ph.D. in psychology from Simon Fraser University in 1976.

Gifford is the author of five editions of Environmental Psychology: Principles and Practice, which has also been translated into Japanese, and edited Research Methods for Environmental Psychology (2016). He developed a list of forty psychological impediments to effectively reacting to climate change called "the dragons of inaction"—these include temporal discounting, lack of place attachment, and mistrust. He was one of the coauthors of a 2011 American Psychological Association report titled "Psychology and Global Climate Change: Addressing a Multi-faceted Phenomenon and Set of Challenges" which described elements of effective climate action messaging, including urgency, certainty, and positive framing.

Gifford is on the editorial board of Architectural Science Review. He has been president of the environmental divisions of the American Psychological Association, the International Association of Applied Psychology and the Canadian Psychological Association.

In February 2021, Gifford was suspended from his position at the University of Victoria after an investigation into a sexual harassment claim by one of his graduate students. In June 2024, he was dismissed from his job. After his union declined to appeal the case, Gifford contested his union representation, but the British Columbia Labour Relations Board found his union appropriately represented him.

== Books ==
- Gifford, Robert, ed. (1991). Applied Psychology: Variety and Opportunity. Boston: Allyn and Bacon. p. 384. ISBN 978-0-205-12664-4.
- Gifford, Robert (2005). 環境心理学〜原理と実践〜 [2-volume Japanese translation of Environmental psychology: Principles and Practice]. Tokyo: Kitaohji Shobo. pp. 370 and 438. ISBN 978-4-76282448-7.
- Gifford, Robert (2014). Environmental Psychology: Principles and Practice (5th ed.). Colville, WA: Optimal Books. p. 599. ISBN 978-0-9937719-0-3.
- Gifford, Robert, ed. (2016). Research Methods for Environmental Psychology (1st ed.). New York: Wiley. p. 438. ISBN 978-1-118-79533-0.

== Awards ==
- 1991 Fellow of the Canadian Psychological Association
- 1992 Fellow of the American Psychological Association
- 2007 Fellow of the Association for Psychological Science
- 2007 Career Award from the Environmental Design Research Association
- 2016 Newman-Proshansky Career Achievement Award (Division 34, American Psychological Association)
- 2016 Award for Distinguished Contributions to the International Advancement of Psychology (Canadian Psychological Association)
- 2019 Fellow of the Royal Society of Canada
