= Conservation psychology =

Conservation psychology is the scientific study of the reciprocal relationships between humans and the rest of nature, with a particular focus on how to encourage conservation of the natural world. Rather than a specialty area within psychology itself, it is a growing field for scientists, researchers, and practitioners of all disciplines to come together and better understand the Earth and what can be done to preserve it. This network seeks to understand why humans hurt or help the environment and what can be done to change such behavior. The term "conservation psychology" refers to any fields of psychology that have understandable knowledge about the environment and the effects humans have on the natural world. Conservation psychologists use their abilities in "greening" psychology and make society ecologically sustainable. The science of conservation psychology is oriented toward environmental sustainability, which includes concerns like the conservation of resources, conservation of ecosystems, and quality of life issues for humans and other species.

One common issue is a lack of understanding of the distinction between conservation psychology and the more-established field of environmental psychology, which is the study of transactions between individuals and all their physical settings, including how people change both the built and the natural environments and how those environments change them. Environmental psychology began in the late 1960s (the first formal program with that name was established at the City University of New York in 1968), and is the term most commonly used around the world.

Its definition as including human transactions with both the natural and built environments goes back to its beginnings, as exemplified in these quotes from three 1974 textbooks: "Environmental psychology is the study of the interrelationship between behavior and the built and natural environment" and "...the natural environment is studied as both a problem area, with respect to environmental degradation, and as a setting for certain recreational and psychological needs", and a third that included a chapter entitled The Natural Environment and Behavior.

Conservation psychology, proposed more recently in 2003 and mainly identified with a group of US academics with ties to zoos and environmental studies departments, began with a primary focus on the relations between humans and animals. Introduced in ecology, policy, and biology journals, some have suggested that it should be expanded to try to understand why humans feel the need to help or hurt the environment, along with how to promote conservation efforts.

== Who is involved ==
The work of this domain seeks to combine the specialities across modern psychology to seek to develop congruent relationships between biological realms and a broader human experience. These psychologists work together with places such as zoos and aquariums, as an arena of public engagement to interact and understand the issues between humans and the environment. Work on these topics combines conservation biology and human ecology to define this speciality for psychologists working to collaborate on issues of sustainability.

== Research to consider ==
What characterizes conservation psychology research is that in addition to descriptive and theoretical analyses, studies will explore how to cause the kinds of changes that lessen the impact of human behavior on the natural environment, and that lead to more sustainable and harmonious relationships. Some of the research being done with respect to conservation is estimating exactly how much land and water resources are being used by each human at this point along with projected future growth.

Also important to consider is the partitioning of land for this future growth. Additionally, conservation efforts look at the positive and negative consequences for the biodiversity of plant and animal life after humans have used the land to their advantage. In addition to creating better conceptual models, more applied research is needed to: 1) identify the most promising strategies for fostering ways of caring about nature, 2) find ways to reframe debates and strategically communicate to the existing values that people have, 3) identify the most promising strategies for shifting the societal discourse about human–nature relationships, and 4) measure the success of these applications with respect to the conservation psychology mission.

The ultimate success of conservation psychology will be based on whether its research resulted in programs and applications that made a difference with respect to environmental sustainability. We need to be able to measure the effectiveness of the programs in terms of their impact on behavior formation or behavior change, using tools developed by conservation psychologists.

== Present research and future planning ==
Conservation psychology research has broken down the four most important tenets of promoting positive conservation attitudes into "the four 'I's". These include: Information, Identity, Institutions, and Incentives. Research has been done in all four categories.

=== Information ===
Studies have shown that the way in which crises are presented is a key predictor for how people will react to them. When people hear that they personally can help to alleviate a crisis through their conservation efforts, just by simple actions with their personal energy use, they are more likely to conserve. However, if people are told that the other people around them are overusing energy, it increases selfish behavior and causes people to actually consume more. Other studies show that when people believe in the efficacy of collective action, awareness of the predicament climate change places on society can lead to pro-environmental behaviour. Furthermore, when adequate support is provided for climate related emotions to be reflected on and processed, this leads to an increase in resilience and community engagement.

Teaching people about the benefits of conservation, including easy ways to help conserve, is an effective way to inform about and promote more environmentally friendly behavior. Additionally, research has shown that making sure people understand more about the boundaries of land they can help preserve actually improves positive attitudes towards conservation. When people know more about local regions they can help protect, they will care more. Knowing more about the regions includes knowing the extent of the biodiversity in that region, and being sure that the ecosystem will remain healthy and protected. Cost analysis is another important factor. People do not want to take risks on valuable lands, which in places like California, could be worth billions.

=== Identity ===
In general, people like to fit in and identify with their peer social groups. Studies have shown people identify more intimately with close friends and family, which is why conservation campaigns try to directly address the most people. The "think of the children" argument for conservation follows this logic by offering a group everyone can relate to and feel close to. Studies have also shown that this need to fit in among peer social groups can be reinforced positively or negatively: giving positive feedback on energy bills for conserving in their homes encourages people to continue lower energy use. Examples of negative reinforcement include the use of negative press against companies infamous for heavy pollution.

Another interesting line of research looks at how people identify positively or negatively with certain issues. One relevant idea is the notion of "consistency attitudes". Studies have shown that people tend to take a good association they have, and then use this to make positive or negative links with other, related things. For example, if someone thinks it is a good idea to protect old Pacific forests, this will positively form a link to also want to protect smaller forests and even grasslands. This same line of thinking can cause someone who supports the protection of old Pacific forests to start thinking negatively about the creation of more logging roads. Other studies on consistency attitudes have shown that, with one particular issue, people like to align their preferences with each other. This has been shown repeatedly while looking at political ideologies and racial attitudes, and studies have shown that this can also include environmental issues. Finally, other studies have shown that how people identify an ecosystem geographically can affect their concern for it. For instance, when people think of saving the rainforests, they often think of this as a global problem and support it more readily. However, lesser known, but still significant, are the local ecosystems that remain ignored and unprotected.

=== Institutions ===
Another approach that has been considered is the use of organized institutions and government as the leaders for promoting conservation. However, these leaders can only be effective if they are trusted. Studies from previous crises where conserving resources was extremely necessary showed that people were more likely to obey energy restrictions and follow certain leaders when they felt they could trust the people directing them. That is, people are more likely to obey restrictions when they believe that they are being encouraged to act a certain way out of necessity and that they are not being misled.

=== Incentives ===
Incentivizing conservation through rewards and fines is another approach. Studies have shown that people who identify more with their community need less incentives to conserve than those who do not identify strongly with their surrounding community. For corporations, monetary incentives have been shown to work for companies showing some effort to make their buildings and practices more "green".

Studies have also shown that doing something as simple as putting a water meter in homes has helped incentivize conservation by letting people track their energy consumption levels. Finally, studies have shown that when giving fines, it is better to start with very small and then raise it for repeated violations. If the fines are too high, the issue becomes too economic, and people start to mistrust the authorities enforcing the fines.

== Main concepts ==
Conservation psychology assesses as a whole four different concepts. At the country's first Conservation Psychology conference these four things were discussed. The first is the main original topic of the field, and the other three are topics with a previous history in environmental psychology.

The first topic being discussed is the connection of humans and animals. The Multi-Institutional Research Project (MIRP) works diligently on finding ways to develop a compassionate stance towards animals in the public eye. Many different questions were assessed to find answers to questions concerning ways to help develop loving attitudes for animals and the earth. With these questions and answers, effective educational and interpretive programs were made that would help review the progress.

The second concept that was discussed at the conference concerned connections of humans and places. A new language of conservation will be supported if there are abundant opportunities for meaningful interactions with the natural world in both urban and rural settings. Unfortunately, as biodiversity is lost, every generation has fewer chances to experience nature. It is estimated that more than 80% of the world's population currently lives under light-polluted skies.

Light pollution, along with urbanization, adds to the rising alienation between people and nature, which has been defined as "the extinction of experience". This rising distance is affecting public support for conservation efforts by preventing people from connecting with, understanding, and developing ties to the natural environment as well as the related cultural heritage. For example the Milky Way, which is a common theme in many founding myths, is currently hidden from one-third of the global population.

Miller (2005) contends that designing urban landscapes that encourage "meaningful interactions with the natural world" can help address this growing distance between humans and the skies. Giving individuals access to the Milky Way and letting them experience the natural cycles of sunshine and moonlight, to which they are genetically preadapted to synchronize their physiology and behavior, may be the most meaningful way to help them re-establish a connection with nature.

There were many questions asked concerning how humans in their everyday lives could be persuaded or educated well enough to make them want to join in programs or activities that help maintain biodiversity in their proximity. Local public and private organizations were asked to come together to help find ways to protect and manage local land, plants, and animals. Other discussions came to whether people on an individual or community level would voluntarily choose to become involved in maintaining and protecting their local biodiversity. These plus many other important questions were contemplated. Techniques in marketing are a key tool in helping people connect to their environment. If an identity could be connected from the environment to towns becoming more urbanized, maybe those living there would be more prone to keep it intact.

The third discussion covered the aspects of producing people who act environmentally friendly. Collectively, any activities that support sustainability, either by reducing harmful behaviors or by adopting helpful ones, can be called conservation behaviors. Achieving more sustainable relationships with nature will basically require that large numbers of people change their reproductive and consumptive behaviors.

Any action, small or large, that helps the environment in any way is a good beginning to a future of generations who only practice environmentally friendly behavior. This may seem to be a far-fetched idea but with any help at all in educating those who do not know the repercussions of their actions could help achieve this. Approaches to encouraging a change in behavior were thought about carefully. Many do not want to change their way of life. A more simplistic lifestyle rather than their materialistic, current lives hurts their environment around them rather than help, but could people willingly change? To take public transportation rather than drive a car, recycling, turning off lights when they are not needed, all these things are very simple yet a nuisance to actually follow through with. Would restructuring tax-code help people to want to change their attitudes? Any concept to reach the goal of helping people act ecologically aware was discussed and approached. Some empirical evidence shows that simply "being the change you want to see in the world" can influence others to behave in more environmentally friendly ways as well.

The fourth and final point at the first Conservation Psychology convention was the discussion of the values people have to their environment. Understanding our relationship to the natural world well enough so that we have a language to celebrate and defend that relationship is another research area for conservation psychology. According to the biophilia hypothesis, the human species evolved in the company of other life forms, and we continue to rely physically, emotionally, and intellectually on the quality and richness of our affiliations with natural diversity. A healthy and diverse natural environment is considered an essential condition for human lives of satisfaction and fulfillment. Where did they get these values and are they ingrained to the point they cannot be changed? How can environmentally educated people convey value-based communication to a community, a nation, or even on a global level? National policy for this model is something that is desired but under such strong political scrutiny this could be very challenging. Advocates for biodiversity and different programs came together to try to find methods of changing Americans' values concerning their environment and different methods to express and measure them.

== Connection of conservation in biology and psychology ==
Conservation biology was originally conceptualized as a crisis-oriented discipline, with the goal of providing principles and tools for preserving biodiversity. This is a branch of biology that is concerned with preserving genetic variation in plants and animals. This scientific field evolved to study the complex problems surrounding habitat destruction and species protection. The objectives of conservation biologists are to understand how humans affect biodiversity and to provide potential solutions that benefit both humans and non-human species. It is understood in this field that there are underlying fields of biology that could readily help to have a better understanding and contribute to conservation of biodiversity.

Biological knowledge alone is not sufficient to solve conservation problems, and the role of the social sciences in solving these problems has become increasingly important. With the knowledge of conservation biology combined with other fields, much was thought to be gained. Psychology is defined as the scientific study of human thought, feeling, and behavior.

Psychology was one of the fields that could take its concepts and apply them to conservation. It was also always understood that in the field of psychology there could be much aid to be given, the field only had to be developed. Psychology can help in providing insight into moral reasoning and moral functioning, which lie in the heart of human–nature relationships.

== See also ==
- Biodiversity
- Conservation movement
- Conservation ethic
- Ecopsychology
- Environmental movement
- Environmental psychology
- Natural environment
- Sustainability

== Notes ==
- Brook, Amara; Clayton, Susan. Can Psychology Help Save the World? A Model for Conservation Psychology. Analyses of Social Issues and Public Policy, Vol. 5, No. 1, 2005, pp. 87–102.
- De Young, R. (2013). "Environmental Psychology Overview." In Ann H. Huffman & Stephanie Klein [Eds.] Green Organizations: Driving Change with IO Psychology. (Pp. 17-33). NY: Routledge.
- Exploring the Potential of Conservation Psychology. Human Ecology Review, Vol 10. No. 2. 2003. pp. iii–iv.
- Kahn, P.K., Jr. 1999. The human relationship with nature. Development and culture. Massachusetts Institute of Technology Press, Cambridge, Massachusetts.
- Kellert, S.R. & Wilson E.O. (eds.). 1993. The Biophilia Hypothesis. Washington, DC: Island Press.
- Mascia, M.B.; Brosius, J.P.; Dobson, T.A.; Forbes, B.C.; Horowitz, L.; McKean, M.A. & N.J. Turner. 2003. Conservation and the social sciences. Conservation Biology 17: 649–50.
- Miller, J. 2006. Biodiversity conservation and the extinction of experience. Trends in Ecology & Evolution: in press.
- Myers, Gene. Conservation Psychology. WWU. January 20, 2002.
- Myers, D.G. 2003. Psychology, 7th Edition. New York: Worth Publishers.
- Saunders, C.D. 2003. The Emerging Field of Conservation Psychology. Human Ecology Review, Vol. 10, No, 2. 137–49.
- Soule, M.E. (1987). History of the Society for Conservation Biology: How and why we got here. Conservation Biology, 1, 4–5.
- Werner, C.M. 1999. Psychological perspectives on sustainability. In E. Becker and T. Jahn (eds.), Sustainability and the Social Sciences: A Cross-Disciplinary Approach to Integrating Environmental Considerations into Theoretical Reorientation, 223–42. London: Zed Books.
- Zelezny, L.C. & Schultz, P.W. (eds.). 2000. Promoting environmentalism. Journal of Social Issues 56, 3, 365–578.
