= Journal of Environmental Psychology =

- Discipline: Environmental psychology Social psychology
- Language: English
- Edited by: Dr. Lindsay J. McCunn and Dr. P. Wesley Schultz

Publication details
- History: 1980 to present
- Publisher: Elsevier (United States)
- Impact factor: 7.3 (2025)

Standard abbreviations
- ISO 4: J. Environ. Psychol.

Indexing
- ISSN: 0272-4944

Links
- Journal homepage; Online access

The Journal of Environmental Psychology is a peer-reviewed academic journal published by Elsevier. Its founding editors were David Canter (University of Liverpool) and Kenneth Craik (University of California, Berkeley) back in 1981. From 2004 to 2016, Robert Gifford (University of Victoria) was the editor-in-chief. In 2017 and 2018, Florian G. Kaiser (Otto-von-Guericke University) and Jeffrey Joireman (Washington State University) were the co-chief editors. From 2019 to 2021 Sander van der Linden (University of Cambridge) was the Editor-in-Chief. Since 2021, Drs. Lindsay J. McCunn and Wesley Schultz have co-edited the journal.

The journal is the primary outlet for academic research in environmental psychology and reports scientific research on all human interactions with the built, social, and natural environment, with an emphasis on the individual and small-group level of analysis. The journal is published in association with the International Association of Applied Psychology (IAAP).

According to the Journal Citation Reports, Journal of Environmental Psychology had a 2020 impact factor of 5.192. This increased in 2021 to 7.649; the most recent (2025) score is 7.3.
