= Children, Youth and Environments =

- Discipline: Psychology, sociology, education, urban and regional planning, environmental psychology
- Language: English
- Edited by: Victoria Carr, Rhonda Brown, Vikas Mehta

Publication details
- Former names: Children's Environments Quarterly, Children's Environments
- History: 1984–present
- Publisher: University of Cincinnati (United States)
- Frequency: Biannually
- Open access: Yes

Standard abbreviations
- ISO 4: Child. Youth Environ.

Indexing
- ISSN: 1546-2250
- JSTOR: 15462250
- OCLC no.: 52938983

Links
- Journal homepage

Children, Youth and Environments is a biannual peer-reviewed academic journal that publishes research articles, in-depth analyses, field reports, and book reviews on research, policy, and practice concerning inclusive and sustainable environments for children and youth worldwide.

From 1984 through 1995, it was produced in print through the Children's Environments Research Group at the City University of New York with Roger Hart as editor-in-chief. Since 2016, it has been published online by the University of Cincinnati.

== Abstracting and indexing ==
The journal is abstracted and indexed in:

- Community Services Abstracts
- Education Facilities Clearinghouse
- Journal of Planning Literature
- Sage Family Studies Abstracts
- Sage Urban Studies Abstracts
- Sociological Abstracts
