= Leanne Rivlin =

American psychologist (1929–2026)

Leanne Rivlin (November 30, 1929 – January 5, 2026) was an American psychologist who was the originator of the Environmental Psychology Doctoral Program at the CUNY Graduate Center in the late 1960s. Rivlin died on January 5, 2026, at the age of 96.

== Life and career ==
=== Education ===
- Ph.D., M.A. Teachers College, Columbia University (1953,1957)
- B.A. Brooklyn College, Psychology & English (1952)

=== Positions held ===
- Professor, Deptartment of Psychology, Environmental Psychology PhD Program, The Graduate Center of The City University of New York (1974–present)
- Research Associate, Environmental Psychology PhD Program, The Graduate Center of The City University of New York (1970–1974)
- Research Associate, Brooklyn College & The Graduate Center, Ward Design Study (1963–1970)
- Research Consultant, Hunter College High School, Evaluation of experimental arts program on creativity (1960–1962)
- Lecturer, City College, Department of Education (1960)
- Research Associate, Horace Mann-Lincoln Institute, Teachers College, Study of creativity in children (1957–1960)
- Instructor, Brooklyn College, Department of Psychology (1955–1959)

== Publications ==
=== Books ===
- Carr, S., Francis, M. Rivlin, L.G., Stone, A.M. (1992; 1995). Public Space. Cambridge: Cambridge University Press.
- Ittelson, W.H., Proshansky, H.M., Rivlin, L.G., Winkel, G.H. (1974). An Introduction to Environmental Psychology. New York: Holt, Rinehart & Winston.
- Proshansky, H.M., Ittelson, W.H., Rivlin, L.G. (1970). Environmental Psychology: Man and His Physical Setting. New York: Holt, Rinehart & Winston.
- Proshansky, H.M., Ittelson, W.H., Rivlin, L.G. (1976). Environmental Psychology: People and Their Physical Settings, 2nd Edition. Oxford: Holt, Rinehart & Winston.
- Rivlin, L.G., Wolfe, M. (1985). Institutional Settings in Children's Lives. New York: John Wiley & Sons.

=== Journal articles and book chapters ===
- Ittelson, W.H., Proshansky, H.M., Rivlin, L.G. (1970). Bedroom size and social interaction of the psychiatric ward. Environment and Behavior, 2, 255–270.
- Ittelson, W.H., Proshansky, H.M., Rivlin, L.G. (1970). The environmental psychology of the psychiatric ward. In Proshansky, H.M., Ittelson, W.H., Rivlin, L.G. (Eds.). Environmental Psychology: Man and His Physical Setting, pages 419–439. New York: Holt, Rinehart & Winston.
- Ittelson, W.H., Proshansky, H.M., Rivlin, L.G. (1970). The use of behavioral maps in environmental psychology. In Proshansky, H.M., Ittelson, W.H., Rivlin, L.G. (Eds.). Environmental Psychology: Man and His Physical Setting, pages 658–668. New York: Holt, Rinehart & Winston.
- Proshansky, H.M., Ittelson, W.H., Rivlin, L.G. (1972b). Freedom of choice and behavior in a physical setting. In Wohlwill, J.F., Carson, D.H. (Eds.). Environment and the Social Sciences: Perspectives and Applications, pages 29–43. Washington, DC: American Psychological Association.
- Rivlin, L.G. (1959). Creativity and the self-attitudes and sociability of high school students. Journal of Educational Psychology, 50(4), pages 147–152.
- Rivlin, L.G. (1979). Understanding and evaluating therapeutic environments for children In Canter, D, Canter S. (Eds.). Designing for Therapeutic Environments: A review of Research, pages 29–61. Chichester, England: John P. Wiley & Sons.
- Rivlin, L.G. (1982). Group membership and place meanings in an urban neighborhood. Journal of Social Issues, 38(3), pages 75–93.
- Rivlin, L.G. (1986). A new look at the homeless. Social Policy, 16(4), pages 3–10.
- Rivlin, L.G. (1987). The neighborhood, personal identity, and group affiliation. In Altman, I., Wandersman, A. (Eds.). Neighborhood and Community Environments, pages 1–34. New York: Plenum.
- Rivlin, L.G. (1990a). Home and Homelessness in the Lives of Children. In Boxhill, N.A. (Ed.). Homeless Children: The Watchers and the Waiters, page xx. New York: Hawthorne Press.
- Rivlin, L.G. (1990b). Paths towards environmental consciousness. In Altman, I., Christensen, K. (Eds.). Environment and Behavior Studies: Emergence of Intellectual Traditions, pages 169–185. New York: Plenum.
- Rivlin, L.G. (1990c). The significance of home and homelessness. Marriage & Family Review, 15(1/2), pages 39–56.
- Rivlin, L.G. (1994). Public spaces and public life in urban areas. In Neary, S.J., Symes, M.S., Brown, F.E. (Eds.). The Urban Experience: A People-Environment Perspective, pages 289–296. London: Taylor & Francis Group.
- Rivlin, L.G. (2002). The ethical imperative. In Bechtel, R.B., Churchman, A. (Eds.). Handbook of Environmental Psychology, pages 15–27. New York: John P. Wiley & Sons.
- Rivlin, L.G. (2006). Found spaces: Freedom of choice in public life. In Franck, K.A., Stevens, Q. (Eds.). Loose Space: Diversity and Possibility in Urban Life, pages 56–80. New York: Routledge.
- Rivlin, L.G., Imbimbo, J.E. (1989). Self-help efforts in a squatter community: Implications for addressing contemporary homelessness. American Journal of Community Psychology, 17(6), pages 705–728.
- Rivlin, L.G., Manzo, L.C (1988). Homeless children in New York City: A view from the Nineteenth century. Children's Environment Quarterly, 5(1), pages 26–33.
- Rivlin, L.G., Moore, J. (2001). Home-making: Supports and barriers to the process of home. Journal of Social Distress and the Homeless, 10(4), pages 323–336.
- Rivlin, L.G., Proshansky, H.M., Ittelson, W.H. (1969–70). Changes in psychiatric ward design and patient behavior. Transactions of the Bartlett Society, 8, pages 7–32.
- Rivlin, L.G., Rothenberg, M., Justa, F., Wallis, A., Wheeler Jr., F.G. (1974). Children's conceptions of open classrooms through the use of scaled models. In Carson, D.H. (Ed.). Man-Environment Interactions: Evaluations and Applications. Washington, DC: Environmental Design Research Association.
- Rivlin, L.G., Rothenberg, M. (1976). The use of space in open classrooms. In Proshansky, H.M., Ittelson, W.H., Rivlin, L.G. (Eds.). Environmental Psychology: People and Their Physical Settings, pages 479–489. New York: Holt, Rinehart & Winston.
- Rivlin, L.G., Weinstein, C.S. (1984). Educational issues, school settings, and environmental psychology. Journal of Environmental Psychology, 4(4), pages 347–364.
- Rivlin, L.G., Wolfe, M. (1972). The early history of a psychiatric hospital for children: Expectations and reality. Environment and Behavior, 4, pages 33–72. [Also found in Environmental Psychology, 2nd Edition (1976) pages 459–479]
- Rivlin, L.G., Wolfe, M., Beyda, M. (1973). Age-related differences in the use of space in a children's psychiatric hospital. In Preiser, W. (Ed.). Environmental Design Research, Volume One, pages 191–203. Stroudsburg, Pennsylvania: Dowden, Hutchinson and Ross.
- Wolfe, M., Rivlin, L.G. (1987). The institutions in children's lives. In Weinstein, C.S., David, T.G. (Eds.). Space for Children: The Built Environment and Child's Development, pages 89–114. New York: Plenum.

=== Book reviews ===
- Rivlin, L.G. (1976). Book review: Alternative Learning Environments by C.J. Coates (Ed.). Journal of Architectural Research, 5, pages 38–39.
- Rivlin, L.G. (184). Book review: Homelessness in America: A Forced March to Nowhere by M.E. Hombs & M. Snyder. Journal of Architectural and Planning Research, 2(1), pages 153-15x.
- Rivlin, L.G. (1993). Book review: Silent Sisters: A Study of Homeless Women by B.G. Russell. Sex Roles, 28, page xx.
- Rivlin, L.G. (1994). Book review: The Women Outside: Meanings and Myths of Homelessness by S. Golden. Gender, Place and Culture, 1(1), pages 132–134.
