= Environmental Design Research Association =

International interdisciplinary organization

- Abbreviation: EDRA
- Formation: 1968
- Type: International interdisciplinary organization
- Purpose: Advancement and dissemination of environmental design research; understanding the relationship between people and their built and natural environments

The Environmental Design Research Association (EDRA) is an international, interdisciplinary organization founded in 1968 by design professionals, social scientists, students, educators, and facility managers.

== Purpose ==
The purpose of EDRA is the advancement and dissemination of environmental design research, thereby improving understanding of the interrelationships between people, their built and natural surroundings, and helping to create environments responsive to human needs. Along with IAPS, MERA, PaPER, and EBRA, EDRA is one of the major international associations that focuses on the field of Environmental Design Research.

== EDRA Conferences ==
EDRA holds an annual conference in different locations around the United States and around the world. The first annual conference was held at Chapel Hill, North Carolina on June 8–10, 1969. Most conferences are held in the United States where the EDRA membership is concentrated, but over the last 40 years, four have been held in Canada (EDRA18/1976 in Vancouver, EDRA 18/1987 in Ottawa, EDRA 28/1993 in Montreal, and EDRA 36/2005 in Vancouver), two have been held in Mexico (EDRA 22/1991 in Oaxtapec and EDRA 39/2008 in Veracruz), and one was held in Scotland (EDRA 32/2001 in Edinburgh). EDRA celebrated its 40th anniversary in Kansas City, Missouri May 27–31, 2009.

Proceedings are published as part of each conference. These include full-length refereed and invited papers, symposium, workshops, and posters.

== Honors and awards ==
- Great Places Award (sponsored by the Journal Places, Metropolis and EDRA): An increasingly prestigious award given since 1998 for outstanding design projects in the categories of planning, design, research, and books. Past winners have included Bryant Park in New York City, the Heidelberg Project in Detroit, and Landschaftspark Duisburg-Nord in Germany.
- EDRA Career Award: An annual award honoring a career and significant contributions in environmental design research, teaching or practice. Past award winners include Robert Gifford, Leanne Rivlin, and Amos Rapoport.
- EDRA Achievement Award: An annual award recognizing an outstanding contribution to the field of environment-behavior design and research. Past winners include William H. Whyte for the Street Life Project and Roger Hart, Children's Environmental Research Group.
- EDRA Service Award: An annual award recognizing service to EDRA above and beyond the call of duty.
- EDRA Student Paper Award: Awarded for an outstanding full-length paper by a student.
- EDRA Student Design Award
- Nature & Ecology Network Sponsored Student Paper Award

== Networks ==
There are 19 interest area networks:

- Interior Design
- Cities & Globalization
- Cultural Aspects of Design
- Communication & Environment
- International Housing Research
- Children, Youth and Environments
- Cyberspace & Digital Environments
- Work Environments
- POE/Programming
- Active Living
- Participation
- Nature & Ecology
- Historic Preservation
- Residential Environments
- Building Process Alliance
- Environment & Gerontology
- Health
- Movement in Designed Environments
- International Connections

== See also ==
- American Institute of Architects
- American Planning Association APA
- American Psychological Association APA
- Children, Youth and Environments (Journal)
- American Society of Interior Designers ASID
- International Association of People-Environment Studies IAPS
