= Ecological psychology =

Scientific study

Ecological psychology is the scientific study of the relationship between perception and action, grounded in a direct realist approach. This school of thought is heavily influenced by the writings of Roger Barker and James J. Gibson and stands in contrast to the mainstream explanations of perception offered by cognitive psychology. Ecological psychology is primarily concerned with the interconnectedness of perception, action and dynamical systems. A key principle in this field is the rejection of the traditional separation between perception and action, emphasizing instead that they are inseparable and interdependent.

== Background ==
In ecological psychology, perceptions are shaped by an individual's ability to engage with their emotional experiences in relation to the environment. This emotional engagement influences action, fostering collective processing, building social capital, and promoting pro-environmental behavior. Ecological psychology is informed from the theoretical frameworks of pragmatism, behaviorism, phenomenology, and Gestalt Theory. Contemporary trends in ecological psychology are also informed by dynamic touch, affordances, development and learning, social coordination, and sport.

== Barker ==
Roger Barker's work was based on his empirical work at the Midwest Field Station. He wrote later: "The Midwest Psychological Field Station was established to facilitate the study of human behavior and its environment in situ by bringing to psychological science the kind of opportunity long available to biologists: easy access to phenomena of the science unaltered by the selection and preparation that occur in laboratories." The study of environmental units (behavior settings) grew out of this research. In his classic work "Ecological Psychology" (1968) he argued that human behaviour was radically situated: in other words, you couldn't make predictions about human behaviour unless you know what situation or context or environment the human in question was in. For example, there are certain behaviours appropriate to being in church, attending a lecture, working in a factory etc., and the behaviour of people in these environments is more similar than the behaviour of an individual person in different environments. Barker later developed these theories in a number of books and articles.

== Gibson ==
James J. Gibson, too, stressed the importance of the environment, in particular, the (direct) perception of how the environment of an organism affords various actions to the organism. Thus, an appropriate analysis of the environment was crucial for an explanation of perceptually guided behaviour. He argued that animals and humans stand in a 'systems' or 'ecological' relation to the environment, such that to adequately explain some behaviour it was necessary to study the environment or niche in which the behaviour took place and, especially, the information that 'epistemically connects' the organism to the environment.

It is Gibson's emphasis that the foundation for perception is ambient, ecologically available information – as opposed to peripheral or internal sensations – that makes Gibson's perspective unique in perceptual science in particular and cognitive science in general. The aphorism: "Ask not what's inside your head, but what your head's inside of" captures that idea. Gibson's theory of perception is information-based rather than sensation-based, and to that extent, an analysis of the environment (in terms of affordances), and the concomitant specificational information that the organism detects about such affordances, is central to the ecological approach to perception. Throughout the 1970s and up until his death in 1979, Gibson increased his focus on the environment through the development of the theory of affordances - the real, perceivable opportunities for action in the environment, that are specified by ecological information.

Gibson rejected outright indirect perception, in favour of ecological realism, his new form of direct perception that involves the new concept of ecological affordances. He also rejected the emerging constructivist, information processing and cognitivist views that assume and emphasize internal representation and the processing of meaningless, physical sensations ('inputs') in order to create meaningful, mental perceptions ('output'), all supported and implemented by a neurological basis (inside the head).

His approach to perception has often been criticised and dismissed when compared to widely publicised advances made in the fields of neuroscience and visual perception by the computational and cognitive approaches.

However, developments in cognition studies which consider the role of embodied cognition and action in psychology can be seen to support his basic position.

Given that Gibson's tenet was that "perception is based on information, not on sensations", his work and that of his contemporaries today can be seen as crucial for keeping prominent the primary question of what is perceived (i.e., affordances, via information) – before questions of mechanism and material implementation are considered. Together with a contemporary emphasis on dynamical systems theory and complexity theory as a necessary methodology for investigating the structure of ecological information, the Gibsonian approach has maintained its relevance and applicability to the larger field of cognitive science.

== See also ==
- Action-specific perception
- Ambient optic array
- Community psychology
- Conservation psychology
- Embodied cognition
- Environmental Design Research Association
- Evolutionary psychology
- Field Theory
- Gestalt theory
- Information ecology
- Situated cognition
- Urie Bronfenbrenner
