= Nidotherapy =

Experimental psychotherapy method

Nidotherapy, after nidus (Latin: nest), is an experimental form of psychotherapy, described as "a collaborative treatment involving the systematic assessment and modification of the environment to minimize the impact of any form of mental disorder on the individual or on society".

Recognising that the physical environment and social context in which someone lives interacts with their personality, nidotherapy first helps someone better understand who they are and the circumstances in which they live, before supporting them in a structured way to identify the best fitting environment and social milleu for them.

While nidotherapeutic interventions might look drastically different from one person to the next, it might often include changes to one's living arrangements, relationhships, occupation or physical environment. A simple example might be a person living alone but who is very extraverted stricken with lonliness choosing to move into a shared residence. In contrast, an introverted person who cannot find a quiet place to restore themselves while living in an overcrowded home, might do much better living alone.

== Etymology ==
The word nidotherapy is derived from the Latin nidus, or "nest".

== History ==
It was introduced for patients with severe mental illness, mainly schizophrenia, and personality disorders^{2} who had failed to respond to conventional treatments and were usually antagonistic to services. The aim of nidotherapy is not to change the person but to create a better fit between the environment (in all its forms) and the patient. As a consequence the patient may improve but this is not a direct result of treatment but because a more harmonious relationship has been created with the environment.^{3} An essential part of nidotherapy is a full environmental analysis carried out from the patient's standpoint and with their full cooperation (provided they have the capacity) so that any changes recommended and implemented (the nidopathway) are understood and preferably owned by the patient instead of being imposed. Although nidotherapy has been classed as a psychotherapy, it differs in not trying to alter the patient, only the environment.

== Medical and therapeutic use ==
Nidotherapy has been used mainly in the treatment of severe mental illness in assertive community treatment and community mental health services.^{4-6}

There is no good evidence that any form of nidotherapy is effective, and no high-strength evidence exists to show that any type of treatment is effective for schizophrenia or mania.

== See also ==
- Milieu therapy, psychotherapy involving therapeutic communities
- Person–environment fit, the degree to which individual and environmental characteristics match
- Situational strength, cues provided by the environment regarding the desirability of potential behaviors

== Notes ==
- Tyrer P, Sensky T, Mitchard S (2003). "The principles of nidotherapy in the treatment of persistent mental and personality disorders". Psychotherapy and Psychosomatics. 72 (6): 350–356. doi:10.1159/000073032. PMID 14526138. S2CID 25264936.
- Tyrer P (2025). Adaptive solutions to personality disorder: treating patients with nidotherapy. London: [Routledge].
- Tyrer P (2002). "Nidotherapy: a new approach to the treatment of personality disorder". Acta Psychiatrica Scandinavica. 105 (6): 469–471. doi:10.1034/j.1600-0447.2002.01362.x. PMID 12059852. S2CID 24659639.
- Tyrer P (2009). Nidotherapy: harmonising the environment with the patient. London: Royal College of Psychiatrists Press.
- Tyrer P, Bajaj P (2005). "Nidotherapy: making the environment do the therapeutic work". Advances in Psychiatric Treatment. 11 (3): 232–238. doi:10.1192/apt.11.3.232.
- Byrne P (2007). "Managing the acute psychotic episode". BMJ. 334 (7595): 686–92. doi:10.1136/bmj.39148.668160.80. PMC 1839209. PMID 17395949.
- Tyrer P, Kramo K (2007). "Nidotherapy in practice". Journal of Mental Health. 16: 117–129. doi:10.1080/09638230601182102. S2CID 145463373.
- Ranger M, Tyrer P, Milošeska K, Fourie H, Khaleel I, North B, Barrett B (2009). "Cost-effectiveness of nidotherapy for comorbid personality disorder and severe mental illness: randomized controlled trial". Epidemiologia e Psichiatria Sociale. 18 (2): 128–136. doi:10.1017/s1121189x00001019. PMID 19526744. S2CID 22634522.
- Tyrer P (2003). "Nidotherapy in the treatment of stress". Stress and Health. 19: 127–128. doi:10.1002/smi.972.
