= List of biology websites =

This is an annotated list of biological websites, including only notable websites dealing with biology generally and those with a more specific focus.

- Ask A Biologist - has been hosted by ASU School of Life Sciences since 1997. The website contains a large collection of free content, including images, stories, games, and activities, for students of all ages.
- Actionbioscience - sponsored by the American Institute of Biological Sciences (AIBS) -- providing articles by scientists, science educators, and science students on issues related to seven bioscience challenges: environment, biodiversity, genomics, biotechnology, evolution, new frontiers in science, and bioscience education
- Animal Diversity Web - created by the staff at the Museum of Zoology at the University of Michigan—collecting the natural history, classification, species characteristics, conservation biology, and distribution information of thousands of species of animals
- Animal Genome Size Database - created by Dr. T. Ryan Gregory of the University of Guelph in Canada—publishing genome size estimates for vertebrate and invertebrate animals
- Animal Science Image Gallery - a work of the United States Federal Government—containing images, animations, and video for classroom and outreach learning
- Bioinformatic Harvester - was a bioinformatic meta search engine at KIT Karlsruhe Institute of Technology—working for human, mouse, rat, zebrafish, drosophila and arabidopsis thaliana information
- Catalogue of Life - compiled with sectors provided by 52 taxonomic databases from around the world—planned to become a comprehensive catalogue of all known species of organisms on Earth
- Earth Human STR Allele Frequencies Database (EHSTRAFD) - the natural step in managing populational data reported for Short Tandem Repeat (STR) loci from all over the world...
- Encyclopedia of Life (EOL) - with senior officers from Harvard University and other organizations—a free, online collaborative encyclopedia intended to document all of the 1.8 million species of living organisms known to science
- Encyclopedia of Life Sciences (ELS) - owned by John Wiley & Sons—having both a 20-volume print edition and an online edition
- Encyclopedia of Life Support Systems (EOLSS) - sponsored by UNESCO—an interdisciplinary encyclopedia, inspired by the sustainable development movement
- FishBase - originated by biologist Daniel Pauly—comprehensive database of information about fish
- Flora Europaea - originally printed by Cambridge University Press; later published online by Royal Botanic Garden Edinburgh—allowing any plant found wild or widely cultivated in Europe to be identified to subspecies level
- GoPubMed - knowledge-based search engine for biomedical texts. It allowed users to identify experts in the biomedical field. Defunct.
- Integrated Taxonomic Information System (ITIS) - involving government agencies in Canada, the US, and Mexico—providing an automated reference database of scientific and common names for species
- MycoBank - the complete list of fungi, yeasts and lichens ever described. This large and complete database belongs to the International Mycological Association and is managed by the Westerdijk Institute (Utrecht, The Netherlands)
- NeuroLex - dynamic lexicon of neuroscience concepts
- Pan-American Journal of Aquatic Sciences - an exclusively electronic, free-of-charge peer-reviewed scientific journal
- PDBWiki - discussion forum for macromolecular structures
- Plant DNA C-values Database - created in the UK—a comprehensive catalogue of C-value (nuclear DNA content, or in diploids, genome size) data for land plants and algae
- Plants for a Future (PFAF) - based in the UK—for those interested in edible and useful plants of temperate regions
- Postcodes Plant Database - based in the UK—for identifying locally native plant and species according to postcode
- Proteopedia - annotation of protein structures and other biomolecules
- TOPSAN - annotation of protein structures
- Transterm - hosted at the University of Otago in New Zealand—a database of mRNA sequences, codon usage, and associated cis-regulatory elements that regulate gene expression
- Tree of Life Web Project - written by biologists from around the world—providing information about the diversity and phylogeny of life on Earth
- Wikispecies - supported by the Wikimedia Foundation—to create a comprehensive free content catalogue of all species
- ZooBorns - created by Andrew Bleiman—announces animal births at AZA, EAZA, CAZA and WAZA accredited zoos and aquariums

== See also ==
- List of biodiversity databases
- Lists of websites
