= Conservation behavior =

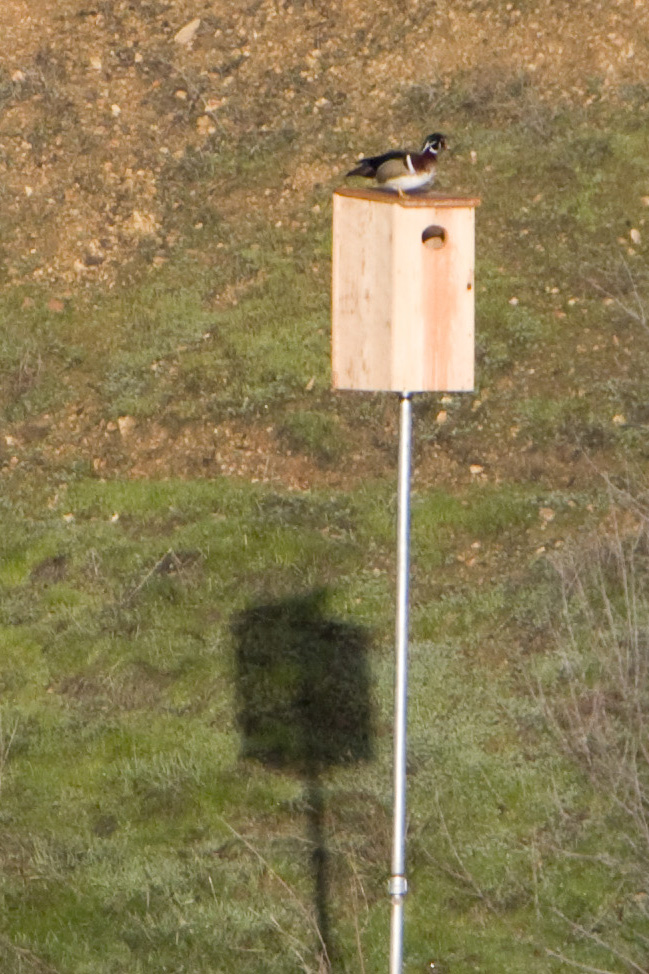
Conservation behavior helped biologists place inconspicuous nest boxes for wood ducks that helped protect from brood parasites.

Ultimately, it is behavior that determines survival.

— Timberlake & Lucas 1989

Conservation behavior is the interdisciplinary field about how animal behavior can assist in the conservation of biodiversity. It encompasses proximate and ultimate causes of behavior and incorporates disciplines including genetics, physiology, behavioral ecology, and evolution.

== Introduction ==
Conservation behavior is aimed at applying an understanding of animal behavior to solve problems in the field of conservation biology. These are problems that may arise during conservation efforts such as captive breeding, species reintroduction, reserve connectivity, and wildlife management. By using patterns in animal behavior, biologists can be successful in these conservation efforts. This is done by understanding the proximate and ultimate causes of problems that arise. For example, understanding how proximate processes affect survival can help biologist train captive-reared animals to recognize predators post-release. Ultimate causes also have a clear benefit to conservation. For example, understanding social relationships that lead to fitness (biology) can help biologists manage wildlife that exhibit infanticide. Conservation projects may have a better chance of being successful if biologists search for a deeper understanding of how animals make adaptive decisions.

While animal behavior and conservation biology are conceptually intertwined, the idea of using animal behavior in conservation management was only first used explicitly in 1974. Since then, conservation behavior has slowly gained prominence with a surge of publications in the field since the mid-1990s and the Animal Behavior Society even forming a committee in support of conservation behavior. A number of studies have shown that animal behavior can be an important consideration during conservation projects. More importantly, ignorance of animal behavior in conservation projects may lead to their failure. Recent calls for stronger integration of behavior and physiology to advance conservation science emphasize the growing recognition that when studying animals in nature it is impossible to decouple behavior and physiology.

== Applications ==
=== Wildlife conservation and management ===
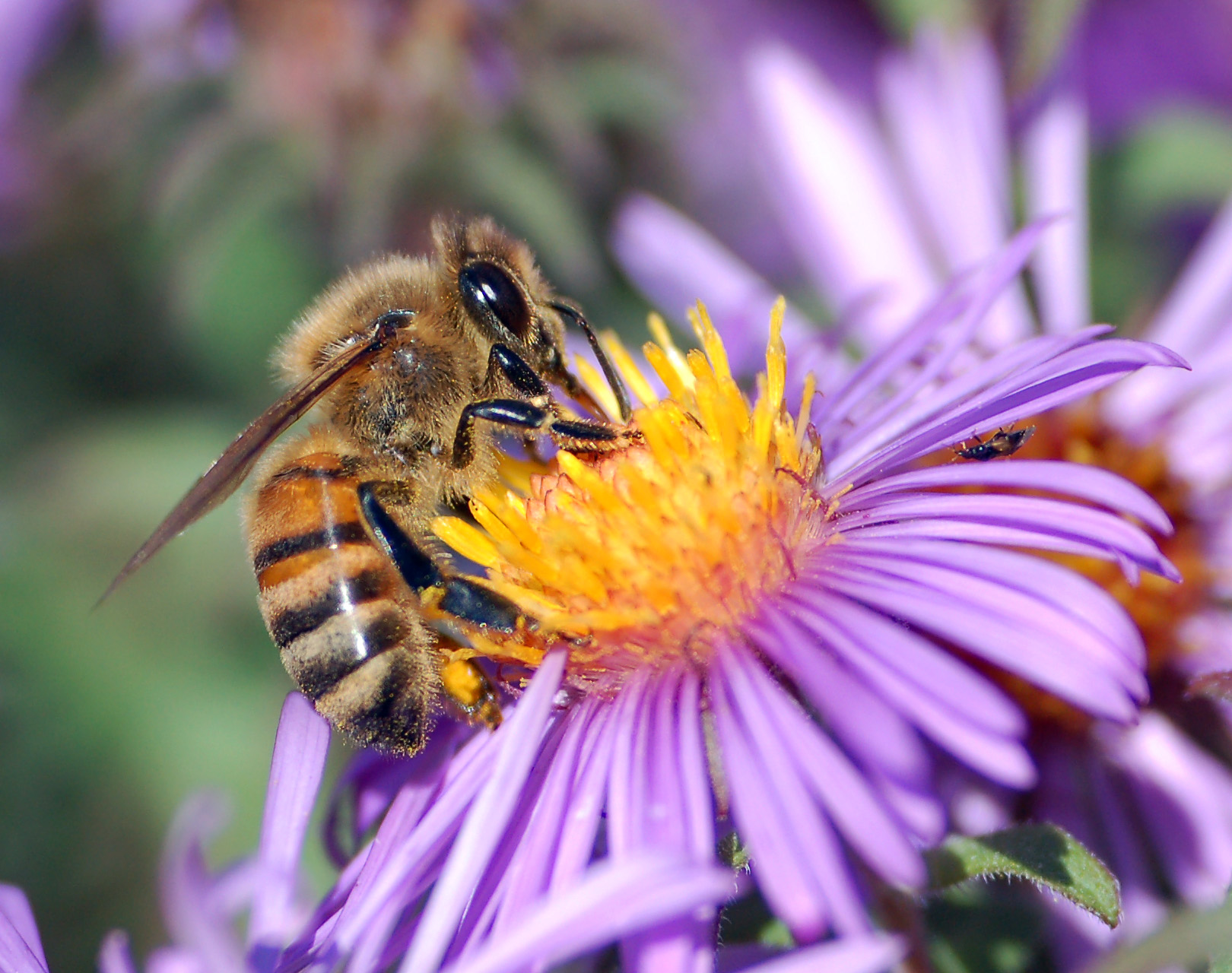
A European honey bee forages for nectar.

Understanding animal behavior can help limit the impact of humans on the environment. Wildlife conservation is concerned with protecting species and their habitats from the impact of human development. Wildlife management is concerned with manipulating and exploiting wild species to achieve a desired end while ensuring their persistence and availability. Because management is often a component of conservation strategies, incorporating knowledge of animal behavior into wildlife management has potential for improving the outcomes of conservation projects. This understanding of animal behavior can help managers design better wildlife and nature reserves, reduce human–wildlife conflict, understand and manage species’ responses to human-induced environmental stress, and manage introduced species.

Wildlife managers commonly try to create wildlife reserves to conserve habitat for species of concern. The behavior of target animals is pivotal in designing the size, shape, location, and habitat of these reserves. For example, many bird reserves in Central and South America are located in high mountains, but in one instance 25% of the local birds left the protected area to forage. Understanding behaviors including recruitment, settling, spawning, foraging, territoriality, daily movements, and seasonal patterns of migration are all important for conservation success.

Minimizing human–wildlife conflict is a persistent challenge in wildlife management and conservation. Behavioral manipulation can help mitigate some conflicts such as livestock depredation or agricultural destruction by repelling animals with strobe lights, sounds, aversive conditioning, or taste aversion. Not only are humans frequently coming into conflict with animals, but humans can also induce environmental stress on animals. Humans can begin to mitigate these stresses by understanding behaviors, such as the effect tourists have on wildlife in reserves.

=== Reducing the decline of species ===
Because an animal's survival and reproductive success relies on its behavior, knowledge of behavior is essential in actively reversing the decline of imperiled wild species. Knowledge of behavior can be used to reduce bycatch of fish species, reestablish breeding populations, or boost reproduction. Understanding the behavior of fish has helped reduce bycatch by improving the selectivity of fishing gear. Species can be separated by their initial response to a trawl mouth, their position within a net, and their responses to visual and rheotactic sensory cues. Use of behavioral characteristics such as these can help reduce tremendous waste that often occurs during industrial fishing and help manage for sustainable fisheries.

The state of a declining species can sometimes be reversed by augmenting reproduction through behavior. By manipulating auditory, olfactory, and visual cues of animals, biologists can attract animals to breeding grounds or increase the number of breeding individuals. This method has been applied most successfully to bird populations. For example, acoustic playbacks have attracted seabirds to historic and new breeding grounds. Similarly, adding eggs to nests of some male fish species may promote increased spawning by females who prefer to spawn with males already possessing eggs.

=== Assessing biodiversity ===
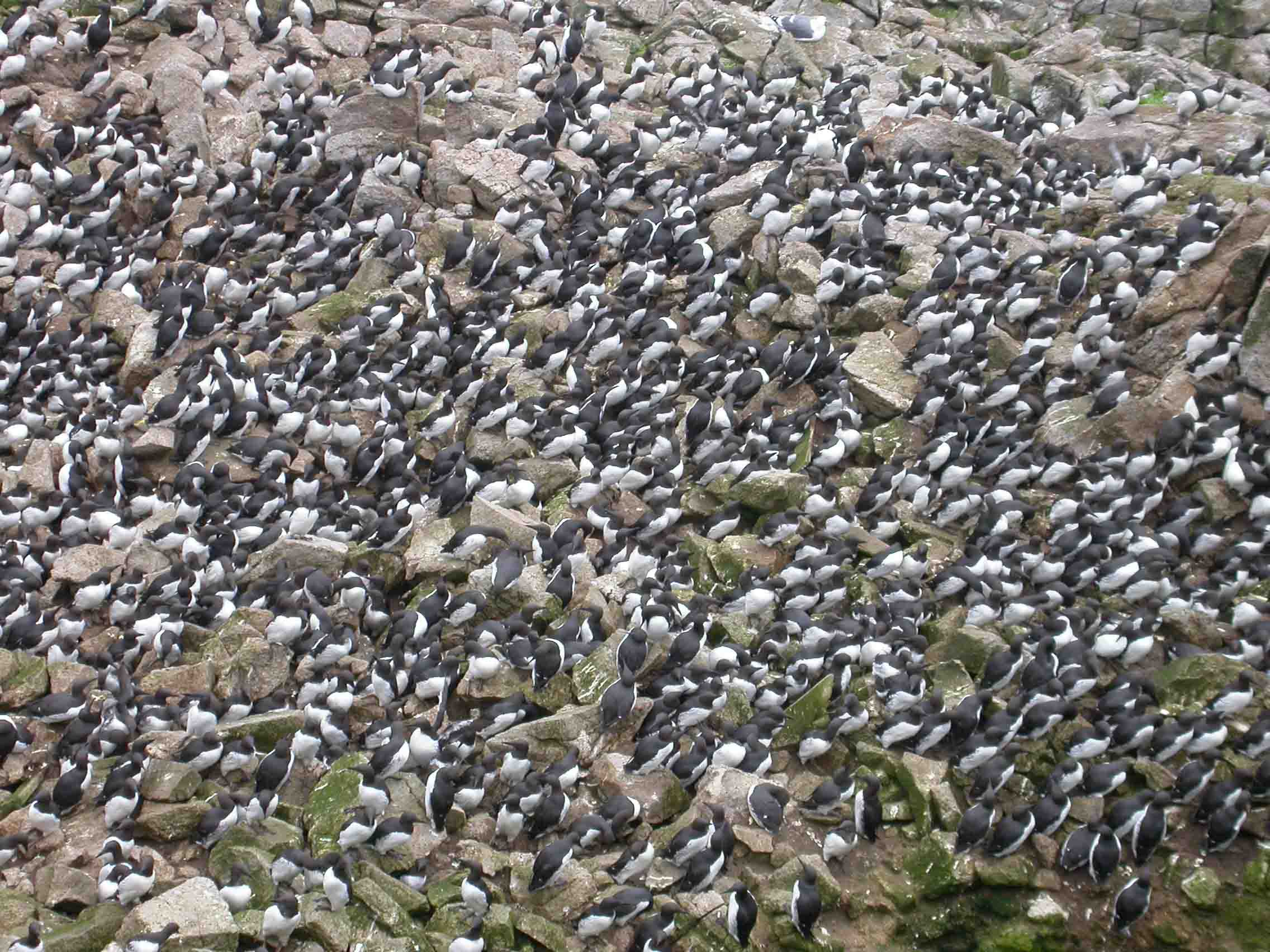
Common murres on densely packed breeding grounds.

Knowing species richness and abundance in a given area has been an important part of ecology since its creation. Censusing and monitoring methods can use animal behavior to assess and track the status of species of concern. Many times this involves using communication signals or other conspicuous behaviors to locate and count species. For example, knowledge of behavior can be used to locate birds by their mating calls, count mammals who are more active during mating season, or track whale vocalizations and dolphin echolocation signals.

Population viability analysis (PVA) can provide important information when assessing the status of a species and help evaluate conservation priorities. PVA is a process that can help determine the probability that a species will go extinct within a given number of years. Along with survival and reproduction, behavior can be factored into population viability models. These are behaviors that influence population demographics such as immigration, emigration, dispersal, and inbreeding depression.

=== Captive breeding and reintroduction ===
Captive breeding and reintroductions of endangered species are becoming more common and necessary for the conservation of some species. Rearing wild animals in a captive setting requires behavioral understanding of factors such as mate choice, social structure, and environmental influences on mating. Many captive breeding and reintroductions have failed due to behavioral deficiencies of released animals because many times captive animals lack natural parental care or other environmental influences during critical learning periods. Animals need to learn a variety of behaviors that may be difficult to replicate in captive settings, including how to forage or catch prey, where it is safe to sleep, how to avoid predators, and intraspecies relationships and traditions. Captive breeding programs often inadvertently alter behaviors of animals including interfering with normal patterns of mate selection, creating inappropriate social conditions, antipredator behavior, and conditioning them to humans. The loss or altercation of behaviors such as these can have devastating effects on released animals.

== Challenges ==
There has been some concern in the field of conservation behavior about the lack of official cohesion between behavior and conservation biology and the potentially avoidable mistakes that have been made in conservation. It has even been argued that theoretical advances in behavior have made little practical contributions to conservation biology. While theory-driven behavior may have yet to become fully integrated into conservation, its importance is clear and application necessary.

== See also ==
- Applied ecology
- Biodiversity
- Conservation biology
- Conservation ethic
- Conservation genetics
- Conservation movement
- Conservation reliant species
- Endangered species
- Environmental protection
- Ethology
- Ex-situ conservation
- Extinction
- Gene pool
- Genetic erosion
- Genetic pollution
- Habitat fragmentation
- In-situ conservation
- IUCN Red List
- List of conservation organisations
- List of conservation topics
- Mutualisms and conservation
- Natural environment
- Overexploitation
- Regional Red List
- Renewable resource
- Society for Conservation Biology
- Tyranny of small decisions
- Water conservation
- Wildlife conservation
- Wildlife management
- World Conservation Monitoring Centre
