= Lists of websites =

This is a list of lists of websites, sorted by type and subject, including comparisons and other lists of lists.

== By type ==
- Academic databases and search engines
- BitTorrent (comparison)
- Blogs
- Chat
- Databases
- Dating (comparison)
- Dictionaries
- Encyclopedias
- Fan wikis
- Forums
- Image-sharing
- Notorious markets
- Question-and-answer
- Satirical
- Search engines
- Social bookmarking
- Social networking
  - Defunct social networking
- Tor onion services
- Video platforms
- Webcomics
- Web directories
- Wikis

== By subject ==
- Biology
  - Biodiversity databases
  - Biological wikis
- Educational videos
- Environmental
- Food and drink
- Video gaming
- Professional wrestling

== Blocked ==
- Blocked in Belgium
- Blocked in China
- Blocked in Russia
- Blocked in Singapore
- Blocked in the United Kingdom

== Other ==
- List of Wikipedias
- List of most-visited websites
- List of most popular social platforms
- List of content platforms by monthly active users
