= Kerala's rainforest gardeners =

Informal group of conservationists

Kerala's rainforest gardeners are a team of twenty to forty local women who look after the plants at the Gurukula Botanical Sanctuary in Kerala, South Western India. Together they seek out, preserve and cultivate species of endangered plants local to the Western Ghats area of Southern India. They also work to restore nearby degraded habitat and run educational programmes. Many of the women do not have formal training or qualifications in Botany or conservation biology. Nevertheless, some have discovered new species, co-authored articles on new plant species in science journals, co-presented at botanical seminars and now train and guide newer gardeners.

== Background ==
Founded in 1981 by Wolfgang Dieter Theuerkauf, a self-taught German conservationist, the now 32-hectare collectively owned, private Gurukula Botanical Sanctuary, lies near the Periya reserve forest in northern Kerala. The sanctuary consists of open beds, greenhouses, nurseries, rainforest, community living spaces and a two-acre botanical garden which is open to the public and serves as a catalyst for educational programmes. The sanctuary aims to restore habitat and conserve some 2,000 plant species. It is sometimes known as the "Noah's Ark for Plants."

Before he died in 2014, Theuerkauf trained and mentored twenty local women to look after the rare species of native plants, including orchids, ferns, and succulents, that he had collected from nearby land that was being cleared. Although the Western Ghats mountain range is listed as a UNESCO World Heritage Site, a growing population, urban sprawl, climate change and deforestation have put the bio-diversity and bio-abundance in the area under massive threat. Thanks to the work of the founder and the rainforest gardeners, the sanctuary is now a refuge for 40% of plant species found in the Western Ghats. The Gurukula Botanical Sanctuary community project has been supported by Rainforest Concern since 2006.

== The gardeners ==
Most of the women now living and working at the sanctuary had left school by the age of 15 or 16 and have no formal training in Botany or plant conservation. They have however been carefully observing the plants in their care over the years and have experimented with different conditions to find out what helps the plants to thrive. Many of the women have worked at the sanctuary community for years and are now acknowledged as rainforest ecology experts. They wear boots to protect against snakes and leeches and work long hours. A senior gardener at the sanctuary is Sheena Mol. She joined the community when she was 15. It was her first job. Laly Joseph was originally in training as an X-ray technician but, needing a job urgently and already loving plants, joined the community of volunteers at the sanctuary some 35 years ago. Joseph now searches for rare plants under threat in the local area, and with the rest of the team restores them to health, experimenting with the best way to conserve and cultivate these 'plant refugees' within the sanctuary. She has discovered new species of plants and co-authors articles and co-presents seminars on rare and new species in scientific journals and conferences. Joseph was included in the '2025 World Everyday Heroes' section of The Guardian Weekly in December 2025.

As well as plant conservation, the women work on the restoration of degraded land, for example parcels of tea and coffee plantations adjoining the sanctuary which have gradually been acquired piece by piece. Suprabha Seshan, originally from Delhi, lives and works at the sanctuary. She joined Gurukula in 1991 as a volunteer intern, stayed on and is now a renowned, published and prize-winning conservationist involved in the sanctuary's education and reforestation projects. The rainforest gardeners use low intervention methods, such as some cutting, clearing, planting and tree dispersal, so that the reforestation or rewilding happens fairly naturally.
