= List of websites blocked in Belgium =

The precise number of websites blocked in Belgium is unknown. Blocking may vary from one Internet Service Provider (ISP) to another with some sites blocked by some ISPs and not by others.

Site blocks in Belgium are at this moment based on DNS Hijacking which has the possibilities of circumventing using proxies or DNS over HTTPS. Blocked websites are redirected to a multilingual StopPage

== Verification ==
There is no official complete register of blocked sites. Blocked content includes:

- Court orders (mainly for copyright issues)
- Unilateral blocking (some websites have been reported as being blocked without any known court order on the sole initiative of certain ISPs)
- Gambling regulations (Belgian gambling laws requires a Gambling business to have a local physical gambling point and proper license in order to provide online gambling)

== Court-ordered blocked websites ==
These are the sites explicitly listed and blocked by court cases in Belgium.

Site name	Domain or URL	Type of site	Reason	ISPs in Court Case	Blocked By	Start date	Resolution date
The Pirate Bay	thepiratebay.se; thepiratebay.org; thepiratebay.net; thepiratebay.com; thepiratebay.nu; piratebay.org; piratebay.net; piratebay.se; piratebay.no; jimkeyser.se; ripthepiratebay.com	Torrent Indexer	Copyright	Proximus; Telenet	Proximus; Telenet; Numericable (Note: Despite only two ISPs concerned in this court order, many other ISPs have implemented the same blocking without any specific court order. It is not fully known which ISPs decided to enforce this ruling or not.); Orange; Voo	November 2011	
Vitae	vitae.co; vitaetoken.io	Crypto currency	Potential scam		Telenet	June 2021	
LS Script Hub	lsscripthub.xyz	Exploiting	Copyright		Proximus; Telenet; Orange; Voo	June 2023	

== Unilaterally blocked websites ==
These are the sites blocked by some ISPs in Belgium without any known related court-order. It is believed that these blockings are the result of pressure by the Belgian Anti-piracy Federation (BAF) who threatened ISPs with heavy legal fees should they not comply with their request. The list of ISPs below is probably incomplete as each ISP can decide individually on the matter.

Case name	Domain or URL	Type of site	Reason	Blocked by	Start date	Resolution date
The Pirate Bay	thepiratebay.se; depiraatbaai.be	Torrent Indexer	Copyright	Proximus; Orange; Numericable; Telenet; Voo	December 2011	
IsoHunt	isohunt.com	Torrent Indexer	Copyright	Proximus; Orange; Numericable; Telenet; Voo	unknown	Site moved to new domain in October 2013
KickAssTorrents	kat.ph; kickass.to	Torrent Indexer	Copyright	Proximus; Orange; Numericable; Telenet; Voo	August 2013	
BitSnoop	bitsnoop.com	Torrent Indexer	Copyright	Proximus; Orange; Telenet; Voo	August 2013	
ExtraTorrent	extratorrent.cc	Torrent Indexer	Copyright	Proximus; Orange; Telenet; Voo	August 2013	
h33t	h33t.com	Torrent Indexer	Copyright	Proximus; Orange; Numericable; Telenet; Voo	August 2013	Site moved to new domain in December 2013
monova	monova.org	Torrent Indexer	Copyright	Proximus; Orange; Telenet; Voo	unknown	
TorrentReactor	torrentreactor.net	Torrent Indexer	Copyright	Proximus; Orange; Numericable; Telenet; Voo	unknown	
TorrentHound	torrenthound.com	Torrent Indexer	Copyright	Proximus; Orange; Telenet; Voo	unknown	
Yify Subtitles	yifysubtitles.com	Movie Subtitles	Copyright	Proximus; Telenet	February 2016	
LS Script Hub	lsscripthub.xyz	Exploiting Tool	Copyright	Proximus; Telenet; Orange; Voo	June 2023	

== EU-ordered blocked websites ==
These are the sites blocked because of EU mandates.

Site name	Domain or URL	Type of site	Reason	Blocked By	Start date	Resolution date
Sputnik	sputniknews.com	News agency	Political	Orange; EDPnet; Telenet	2022-08-03	
RT	www.rt.com; de.rt.com; francais.rt.com; actualidad.rt.com	News agency	Political	Orange; EDPnet; Telenet	2022-08-03	

== Gambling regulations blocked websites ==
The list of blocked gambling websites is the only official publicly available and maintained blocklist in Belgium. The list is available on the official Belgian Gaming Commission website.
