= PDBWiki =

User-contributed wiki database of protein structure annotations

PDBWiki was a wiki that functioned as a user-contributed database of protein structure annotations, listing all the protein structures available in the Protein Data Bank (PDB). It ran on the MediaWiki wiki application from 2007 to 2013. The website went offline in 2014 and there has not been any way to subsequently access the information that was contributed. PDBWiki contained details of more than 50,000 protein structures and over 50 'user-contributed' annotations, making it a significant resource for the structural biology community.

== Motivation ==
The Protein Data Bank (PDB) is the central archive of experimentally solved biomolecular structures. However, the PDB only allows data retrieval and does not provide functionality for collaboration or user feedback. In contrast, PDBWiki allows for sharing expert knowledge about structures deposited in the PDB. It provides tools for discussing and annotating proteins in a collaborative way. The goal is to create a central and freely-accessible repository of user-contributed information that will be useful for anyone working with PDB structures. As such PDBWiki can be considered a part of a wider effort in community-based biological databases curation.

== About ==
PDBWiki was developed as part of the BioWiki initiative, and was entered into the third International Openfree Bioinformation Contents Competition organised by BiO.CC, a biological information website operated by KOBIC.

The Website went offline in January 2014, replaced with a notice redirecting to Proteopedia, a similar wiki-based structural biology database project.

== See also ==
- Molecular and Cellular Biology 'WikiProject'
