= Plants for a Future =

Online plant database

Plants For A Future (PFAF) is an online not for profit resource for those interested in edible and useful plants, with a focus on temperate regions. Named after the phrase "plans for a future" as wordplay, the organization's emphasis is on perennial plants.

PFAF is a registered educational charity with the following objectives:

The Charity's objectives are to advance the education of the public by the promotion of all aspects of ecologically sustainable vegan-organic horticulture and agriculture with an emphasis on tree, shrub and other perennial species; and the undertaking of research into such horticulture and agriculture, and dissemination of the results of such research.

The website contains an online database of over 8000 plants: 7000 that can be grown in temperate regions including in the UK, and 1000 plants for tropical situations.

The database was originally set up by Ken Fern to include 1,500 plants which he had grown on his 28 acre research site in the South West of England.

Since 2008, the database has been maintained by the database administrator employed by the Plants For A Future Charity.

The organization participates in public discussion by publishing books. Members have participated in various conferences and are also participants in the International Permaculture Research Project.

== Publications ==
- Fern, Ken. Plants for a Future: Edible and Useful Plants for a Healthier World. Hampshire: Permanent Publications, 1997. ISBN 1-85623-011-2.
- Edible Plants: An inspirational guide to choosing and growing unusual edible plants. 2012 ISBN 9781481170017
- Woodland Gardening: Designing a low-maintenance, sustainable edible woodland garden. 2013. ISBN 9781484069165
- Edible Trees: A practical and inspirational guide from Plants For A Future on how to grow and harvest trees with edible and other useful produce. 2013. ISBN 9781493736102
- Plantes Comestibles: Le guide pour vous inspirer à choisir et cultiver des plantes comestibles hors du commun. 2014. ISBN 9781495914690
- Edible Perennials: 50 Top perennial plants from Plants For A Future. 2015.
- Edible Shrubs: 70+ Top Shrubs from Plants For A Future. 2019. ISBN 9781791954949
- Plants for Your Food Forest: 500 Plants for Temperate Food Forests and Permaculture Gardens. 2021. ISBN 9798520865087
- Food Forest Plants for Hotter Conditions: 250+ Perennial Plants For Tropical and Sub-Tropical Food Forests and Permaculture Gardens. 2024. ISBN 979-8883693679.

== See also ==
- Agroforestry
- Postcode Plants Database
