= Mutualisms and conservation =

Mutualism in biological conservation

Conservation is the maintenance of biological diversity. Conservation can focus on preserving diversity at genetic, species, community or whole ecosystem levels. This article will examine conservation at the species level, because mutualisms involve interactions between species. The ultimate goal of conservation at this level is to prevent the extinction of species. However, species conservation has the broader aim of maintaining the abundance and distribution of all species, not only those threatened with extinction (van Dyke 2008). Determining the value of conserving particular species can be done through the use of evolutionary significant units, which essentially attempt to prioritise the conservation of the species which are rarest, fastest declining, and most distinct genotypically and phenotypically (Moritz 1994, Fraser and Bernatchez 2001).

Mutualisms can be defined as "interspecific interactions in which each of two partner species receives a net benefit" (Bronstein et al. 2004). Here net benefit is defined as, a short-term increase in inclusive fitness (IF). Incorporating the concept of genetic relatedness (through IF) is essential because many mutualisms involve the eusocial insects, where the majority of individuals are not reproductively active. The short-term component is chosen because it is operationally useful, even though the role of long-term adaptation is not considered (de Mazancourt et al. 2005). This definition of mutualism should be suffice for this article, although it neglects discussion of the many subtitles of IF theory applied to mutualisms, and the difficulties of examining short-term compared to long-term benefits, which are discussed in Foster and Wenselneers (2006) and de Mazancourt et al. (2005) respectively. Mutualisms can be broadly divided into two categories. Firstly, obligate mutualism, where two mutualistic partners are completely interdependent for survival and reproduction. Secondly, facultative mutualism, where two mutualistic partners both benefit from the mutualism, but can theoretically survive in each other's absence.

Mutualisms are remarkably common, in fact all organisms are believed to be involved in a mutualism at some point during their lives (Bronstein et al. 2004). This is particularly likely to be true for the definition of mutualism adopted here, where herbivory can paradoxically be mutualistic, for example in a situation where a plant overcompensates by producing more biomass when grazed on. Therefore, any species identified as particularly important to conserve will probably have mutualistic partners. It is beyond the purview of this article to discuss all these mutualisms, so the focus will be on specifically animal-plant mutualisms.

== Mutualism coextinction ==
A mutualism coextinction event is where a species goes extinct upon the loss of its mutualist (Koh et al. 2004). Models have attempted to predict when the breakdown of a mutualism leads to coextinction, because in this situation protecting the mutualism will be particularly important for conservation. These models are multi-dimensional, so examine complex networks of interactions, rather than just pairs of interacting species. This means that these models incorporate modelling the breakdown of obligate mutualisms (which lead directly to coextinction), but also the breakdown of facultative mutualisms (which can lead indirectly to coextinction). Koh et al. (2004) use a "nomographic model of affiliate extinctions", which estimates the probability that the extinction of a species leads to the extinction of its mutualist, for a given estimate of the specificity of the mutualism. By applying the model to actual species, Koh et al. (2004) estimate that 200 coextinctions have occurred since records of species extinction began in the past few centuries, and 6300 coextinctions are at risk of occurring in the near future. However, these estimates are not exclusively for mutualism coextinctions (e.g. parasitic coextinctions are incorporated), but mutualism coextinctions make up a significant proportion of the number quoted. Additionally the model predicts that these coextinctions can start extinction cascades, where many other species in the surrounding ecosystem go extinct. Other recent models largely agree with this one, predicting that mutualism coextinction is a very significant cause of species loss, and that it can lead to extinction cascades (Dunn et al. 2009).

Surprisingly, given the model predictions, there are very few recorded examples of global mutualism coextinctions actually occurring (Bronstein et al. 2004, Dunn et al. 2009), and many examples often quoted are unconvincing on examination. For example, a well documented case of animal-plant coextinction and an extinction cascade involves a butterfly (Phengaris arion) to ant (Myrmica sabuleti) interaction. P. arion larvae provide honeydew for the M. sabuleti workers, which raise the caterpillars in their nest. When the Myxoma virus was introduced to control rabbit populations in the UK, the subsequent increase in grassland caused a decrease in soil temperatures at ground level. This caused reductions in the M. sabuleti populations, which led to the extinction of the P. arion populations (Dunn 2005). However, this is actually a relatively weak example, because it was a local (rather than a global) extinction, and the nature of the interaction is often not viewed as mutualistic, because it has been long known that the M. sabuleti caterpillars eat M. sabuleti larvae (Elmes and Thomas 1992).

So, why are there very few documented examples of mutualism coextinctions? There are various possible reasons. Perhaps global mutualism coextinctions are genuinely uncommon, and the model predictions are inaccurate. The models may overestimate the specificity of the mutualisms, because species may only associate with alternative species when their 'normal' mutualist is rare or absent. For example, oligolectic bees visit a small number of flowers for pollen. However, these bees do not generally have strongly specialised anatomy, morphology or physiology. Therefore, in the absence of these usual flowers, many oligolectic bee species are able switch to collecting pollen from flower species they would never normally associate with (Wcislo and Cane 1996). Even some fig wasps, often considered to be in completely obligate relationships, have maintained low population densities when introduced to new areas without their natural mutualist fig tree species (McKey 1989). The models may also underestimate the robustness of the mutualisms. For example, fig trees and fig wasps are coadapted so that the wasps can find the trees from a long distances away (Bronstein et al. 1994).

Alternatively, there may simply be many global mutualism coextinctions that have occurred which we are not yet aware of. This explanation is not unlikely, because mutualisms have generally been understudied as interactions (Bronstein 1994, Richardson et al. 2000). There is additionally the difficulty of defining when a species becomes globally extinct, compared to just extremely rare or maintained exclusively through captive breeding programs. Of course, these stated explanations are not mutually exclusive. However, more research is required to rectify the model predictions of many mutualism coextinctions, with the lack of empirical evidence for such events. Only then can we discover if conserving mutualisms is likely to prevent many global species extinction.

== Mutualism "codeclines" ==
Even if global mutualism coextinctions are genuinely rare, conserving mutualisms may still be important for conservation. As mentioned previously, conservation is not just about preventing extinctions, but also about preventing species decline. Unlike with coextinctions, there are numerous recorded examples of where the decline or extinction of a species has led to the decline of its mutualist ("codeclines"). A documented example of a pollination mutualism breakdown leading to population declines is the Indian rubber tree (Ficus elastica) to its pollinator wasp (Pleistodontes clavigar) interaction. Habitat fragmentation has led to the F. elastica declining to very low population levels. However, F. Elastic can propagate clonally, so has remained extant. Meanwhile, P. clavigar is virtually extinct globally, because the mutualist relationship is probably obligate for P. clavigar (Mawsdley et al. 1998). An example of a seed dispersal mutualism breakdown causing population declines comes from two endemic species on Menorca Island. A frugivorous lizard (Podarcis lilfordi) is a seed disperser of a shrub (Daphne rodriguezii). When P. lilfordi became extinct on Menorca, due to the introduction of carnivorous mammals, D. rodriguezii numbers declined significantly to endangered levels. This D. rodriguezii decline could be attributed to the local extinction of P. lilfordi, due to the lack of seedling recruitment on Menorca compared to other nearby islands, where P. lilfordi remained extant and D. rodriguezii populations larger (Traveset and Riera 2005).

However, in some cases it has been shown that declines of one partner in a mutualism do not lead to significant declines in the other. For example, a Hawaiian vine (Freycinetia arborea) was pollinated in the nineteenth century by four species of birds. These bird species are all now either locally endangered or extinct. Despite this, F. arborea continues to survive in reasonable abundance, but is now mainly pollinated by the recently introduced white-eye (Zosterops japonica) (Cox and Elmqvist 2000). In this case, conservation of the mutualism was not required to maintain the F. arborea population. There are probably no published estimates of how frequently declines of one species do not result in declines of that species' mutualist, due to a 'replacement' mutualist. However, judging by the few examples in the literature where this replacement has been reported to have happened, it seems to be a relatively rare occurrence.

== Alien species in mutualisms ==
The Hawaiian vine example also illustrates that alien species can be involved in animal-plant mutualisms. In fact, alien species are often dependent on mutualisms to establish themselves in new habitats (particularly on islands), and especially those alien species requiring animal-mediated pollination (Richardson et al. 2000). These alien species will, by definition, be beneficial to the short-term inclusive fitness of the species they form a mutualism with. However, the alien species will negatively impact other species in the ecosystem. For example, through competition for resources (including competition for mutualist partners) (Kaiser-Bunbury et al. 2009). In fact, these negative impacts could theoretically cascade through the ecosystem, and lead to the alien species having an indirect long-term negative impact on its mutualist. This means that mutualisms involving alien species is important in conservation. However, the action taken by a conservation organization could be either to conserve or disrupt the mutualism.

In some situations, a conservation organization will want to conserve the mutualistic relationship. For example, many of the Hawaiian Islands have lost the vast majority of their native seed dispersers, and introduced bird species now act as very major seed dispersers of native species. In fact, these exotic species appear to actually facilitate the re-growth of native forests in some areas (Foster and Robinson 2007). In these situations, conserving the native mutualism may become less important than conserving the new one. Alien species involved in mutualisms may actually be desirable for conservationists to protect in a more general way. Alien species are particularly likely to generate highly generalised and asymmetric mutualisms, which help stabilise communities, making them less vulnerable to decline and extinctions (Aizen et al. 2008).

In other situations, conservation will be facilitated by disrupting mutualisms involving alien species. For example, alien bumblebees (Bombus terrestris) have displaced many native pollinators, and pollinated some unwanted weed species, across the globe (Hingston et al. 2002). These mutualisms could lead to a decline in both animal and plant species of particular value to conservation. The empirical evidence would suggest that in the majority of cases a conservation organisation should try to disrupt the mutualisms involving the alien species (Kaiser-Bunbury et al. 2009).

== See also ==
- Conservation biology
- Mutualism (biology)
