= Animal Science Image Gallery =

New service for teachers

The Animal Science Image Gallery a new service for teachers announced by The Animal and Dairy News. Teachers can obtain images in the Animal Science Image Gallery. The site contains images, animations, and video for classroom and outreach learning in the Animal Sciences. Each file in the gallery has passed at least two peer reviews to optimize the image and its metadata, and to ensure that the information is sufficient and accurate. The gallery is searchable via keywords or teachers can browse by subject, download images at no cost, and use them freely for educational purposes.

Harold Hafs (Rutgers University) is the founding Editor-in-Chief. The American Society of Animal Science oversees the peer reviews required of new submissions, and the USDA National Agricultural Library manages the gallery website and the holdings after they are accepted.

The Animal Science Image Gallery began as a partnership between the Animal Science Education Consortium (fifteen colleges and universities in the northeast and mid-Atlantic states) and the National Agriculture Library (NAL), funded (2003-2007) by a USDA Higher Education Challenge Grant. Members of the American Society of Animal Science (ASAS), the American Dairy Science Association, the Poultry Science Association, the Equine Science Society, the American College of Theriogenologists and the Society for the Study of Reproduction have served as editors, reviewers, and submitters. In 2007, ASAS assumed responsibility for oversight of new submissions to the Gallery while the NAL will host the gallery in perpetuity.
