= Postcode Plants Database =

The Postcode Plants Database was a UK resource for identifying locally native plants and species based on postcode, hosted by the Natural History Museum in London.

This resource has been replaced by the analysis pages on the NBN Atlas website. There you can choose to display any groups of UK wildlife within a radius of any given post-code.

== See also ==
- Plants for a Future – online plant database
