= New Roots Institute =

American nonprofit sustainable food organization

- Type: Non-profit
- Purpose: Educational activism to promote the end of factory farming
- Headquarters: Los Angeles, U.S.
- Region served: San Diego, Los Angeles, San Francisco, San Jose, Portland, Seattle, Salt Lake City, Denver, Chicago, New York
- Website: www.newrootsinstitute.org

The New Roots Institute is an American nonprofit organization dedicated to advancing education with the goal of advocating for the end of factory farming practices. It was founded in 2014 by Katie Cantrell in the San Francisco Bay Area. New Roots Institute currently operates in ten different regions across the United States.

== History ==
In 2010, Katie Cantrell, then a student at the University of California, Berkeley developed a presentation on the impacts of factory farming. She began giving the presentation at local colleges and K-12 schools around the San Francisco Bay Area.

In 2012, New Roots Institute received the second most votes in a Facebook poll sponsored by BART's sustainability-focused Blue Sky Program. As a result, New Roots Institute was awarded a month's worth of advertising on BART trains and stations. The ads encouraged BART riders to adopt Meatless Mondays citing the environmental benefits of doing so.

== Current Programs ==
New Roots Institute's current programming consists of educational outreach, a Summer Leadership Academy, and Fellowship, and auxiliary programs.
