= Ecopedagogy =

Pedagogy grounded on the ecological worldview

The ecopedagogy movement is an outgrowth of the theory and practice of critical pedagogy, a body of educational praxis influenced by the philosopher and educator Paulo Freire. Ecopedagogy's mission is to develop a robust appreciation for the collective potentials of humanity and to foster social justice throughout the world. It does so as part of a future-oriented, ecological and political vision that radically opposes the globalization of ideologies such as neoliberalism and imperialism, while also attempting to foment forms of critical ecoliteracy.

One of ecopedagogy's goals is the realization of culturally relevant forms of knowledge grounded in normative concepts such as sustainability, planetarity (i.e. identifying as an earthling) and biophilia (i.e. love of all life).

== Early history ==
The ecopedagogy movement began in a Latin American educational context, growing out of discussions at the second Earth Summit, held in Rio de Janeiro, Brazil in 1992. Educators desired to present a theory and discourse about the interrelationship between society and the environment, a statement would eventually be ratified as the Earth Charter in 2000. In 1999 the First International Symposium on the Earth Charter in the Perspective of Education was held by the Instituto Paulo Freire, Brasil directed by Moacir Gadotti and in collaboration with the Earth Council and UNESCO. This was soon followed by the First International Forum on Ecopedagogy. As a result of these conferences, the Ecopedagogy Charter was also formed, launching the spread of ecopedagogy seminars and programs around the world.

== Objectives and aims ==
Ecopedagogy's primary goal is to create a "planetary consciousness" through revolutionary teaching and learning. The movement aims to create educational programs that interrogate the intersection of social, political, economic and environmental systems. As an outgrowth of critical pedagogy, ecopedagogy critiques environmental education and education for sustainable development as vain attempts by mainstream forms of pedagogy seeking to appear relevant regarding current issues of environmental degradation. It is critical of mainstream representations of nature that are potentially informed by racist, sexist, and classist values, and wary of the tendency of "greenwashing" of environmental terminology.

While members of the ecopedagogy movement recognize that environmental education can accomplish some positive change, they question the ways in which environmental education (especially within global north) is often reduced to forms of experiential pedagogy and outdoor education without questioning the mainstream experience of nature as pristine wilderness. Ecopedagogy points out that environmental education is often tethered to state and corporate-sponsored science and social studies standards or fails to articulate the political necessity for widespread understanding of the unsustainable nature of modern lifestyles. However, ecopedagogy has tried to utilize the ongoing United Nations Decade of Educational for Sustainable Development (2005–2015) to make strategic interventions on behalf of the oppressed, using it as an opportunity to unpack and clarify the concept of sustainable development.

Ecopedagogy scholar Richard Kahn describes the three main goals of the ecopedagogy movement to be:

1. Creating opportunities for the proliferation of ecoliteracy programs, both within schools and society.
2. Bridging the gap of praxis between scholars and the public (especially activists) on ecopedagogical interests.
3. Instigating dialogue and self-reflective solidarity across the many groups among educational left, particularly in light of the existing planetary crisis.

Angela Antunes and Moacir Gadotti (2005) write:

Ecopedagogy is not just another pedagogy among many other pedagogies. It not only has meaning as an alternative project concerned with nature preservation (Natural Ecology) and the impact made by human societies on the natural environment (Social Ecology), but also as a new model for sustainable civilization from the ecological point of view (Integral Ecology), which implies making changes on economic, social, and cultural structures.

According to social movement theorists Ron Ayerman and Andrew Jamison, there are three broad dimensions of environmentally related movements: cosmological, technological, and organizational. In ecopedagogy, these dimensions are outlined by Richard Kahn (2010) as the following:

- The cosmological dimension focuses on how ecoliteracy, i.e. understanding the natural systems that sustain life, can transform people’s worldviews. For example, assumptions about society’s having the right to exploit nature can be transformed into understanding of the need for ecological balance to support society in the long term. The success of such ‘cosmological’ thinking transformations can be assessed by the degree to which such paradigm shifts are adopted by the public.
- The technological dimension is two-fold: critiquing the set of polluting technologies that have contributed to traditional development as well as some which are used or misused under the pretext of sustainable development; and promoting clean technologies that do not interfere with ecological and social balance.
- The organizational dimension emphasizes that knowledge should be of and for the people, thus academics should be in dialogue with public discourse and social movements.

== Discussion of term in literature ==
Ecopedagogy is not the collection of theories or practices developed by any particular set of individuals. Rather, akin to the World Social Forum and other related forms of contemporary popular education strategies, it is a worldwide association of critical educators, theorists, non-governmental and governmental organizations, grassroots activists and concerned citizens who engage in ongoing dialogue and political action. This process attempts to develop ecopedagogical praxis in relation to the needs of particular places, groups and time periods.

The earliest use of the term "ecopedagogy" may have been by de Haan (1984) in a now little-known German text. Shortly thereafter, in the first known English use of the term, Gronemeyer (1987) described ecopedagogy as the merging of environmentalist politics and adult education. Ecopedagogy has also been discussed by Ahlberg (1998); Jardine (2000); Petrina (2000); Yang & Hung (2004); and Payne (2005). The work of Lummis (2002) shares some sympathies, such as a critical theory approach.

Ironically, at the same time it was coined by Freire's friend-cum-critic Ivan Illich (1988) to describe an educational process in which educators and educands become inscribed in abstract pedagogical systems, resulting in pedagogy as an end and not a means. As used by Illich, ecopedagogy is represented by forms of education that seek the total administration of life through mandatory pedagogical experiences of systemization. As such, he believed that the movements for lifelong education and the creation of global classrooms (Illich & Verne, 1981) by bureaucratic educational institutions exemplified such approaches. However, he was also critical of popular environmentalist pedagogy attempting to mobilize people's sentiments for solutions to problems such as global warming, hunger, and rainforest destruction. Illich's point was that such an ecopedagogy works on a problems/solutions axis that implies a global managerialism that is abhorrent to truly sustainable living in the world. This is a different idea from the way the term and concept is being defined and utilized in critical education circles today, though it is potentially of great importance for the future development of the ecopedagogy movement on the whole.

Paulo Freire was himself at work on a book of ecopedagogy upon his death in 1997, parts of which are included in his posthumous Pedagogy of Indignation (2004). Other influential books include: Francisco Gutierrez and Cruz Prado's Ecopedagogy and Planetary Citizenship (1999), Moacir Gadotti's Pedagogy of the Earth (2000), and Richard Kahn's Critical Pedagogy, Ecoliteracy, and Planetary Crisis: The Ecopedagogy Movement.

== Criticisms ==
Both supporters and critics of ecopedagogy agree that historically, critical educators in the West have been largely unsuccessful at addressing environmental issues in their classrooms. However, much disagreement still exists between critics and supporters of ecopedagogy on the ethics, theoretical approach, and methodology of this pedagogical style.

The strongest criticisms of ecopedagogy begins with the idea that Paulo Freire, critical pedagogy's founding figure, was unconscious of ecological challenges. The well-known collection, Rethinking Freire, includes strong criticisms of many aspects of critical pedagogy by Illichan and eco-literacy teachers, criticisms that necessarily include the ecopedagogy movement. One critic, C.A. Bowers, argues that if ecopedagogy (and the larger critical pedagogy of Freire and Gadotti) were universally adopted, it would contribute to the hegemonic spread of Western culture and systems, thereby choking out non-Western ways of thinking, viewing, and interacting with the human and built environments. Bowers further argues that adoption of Freirean ecopedagogy would hasten the existence of a world monoculture and would fail to address the systemic roots of the current ecological crisis and fail to protect the commons from further exploitation. In this view, ecopedagogy is akin to an educational Trojan horse that is little more than a vehicle for transmitting Western culture and domination.

Moderate critics of ecopedagogy argue that the critical lens of ecopedagogy can be useful, but that its adherents must be actively critical of ecopedagogy itself. They argue that without a constant focus on understanding and fostering diversity in thought, culture, and ecosystem, ecopedagogy is meaningless and could be counter-productive to its aims. Ecopedagogy (and critical pedagogy) has also been heavily criticized for not being critical of the categories that underlie its work. Here, critics argue that in valuing individualism, ecopedagogy fails to attend to traditional eco-centered cultures' already deep connection to the non-human world. Moreover, some scholars from the eco- and critical pedagogical traditions fail to recognize how the "primary categories in classical liberal thought may operate in the discourse of critical pedagogy".

== Ecopedagogy in action ==
Ecopedagogy emphasizes the necessity of praxis alongside theory. Besides the specific ecopedagogy degree programs and Paulo Freire Institutes, there are many instances of ecological education that not only teach people the critical thinking of ecopedagogy but also engage them in learning through action. For example, a study conducted with 10-year-old children in West Scotland concluded that interactive dramatic education was successful in engaging students in ecological, social, and political dimensions of global problems such as solid waste and deforestation. The dramatic exercises required to make a decision or take a stance, thus strengthening their understanding and conviction of the issues. And ecopedagogy is not limited to formal students; in Turkey, for example, participatory action research showed that an outdoor community-based ecopedagogy program for university professors was successful in the "promotion of public participation, the engagement of students, teacher and parents in local environmental issues, and the development of social capital to achieve environmental sustainability. By situating local knowledge within critical pedagogy and social activism, these projects can help universities to bridge the gap between academia and society."

Greta Gaard outlines the necessity for children's environmental literature to encompass the following core aspects of ecopedagogy:

- Praxis
- Teaching ABOUT the social and natural environment
- Teaching IN the social and natural environment
- Teaching THROUGH the social and natural environment
- Teaching the connections of sustainability
- Urgency

The question of technology had become increasingly pertinent. While the production and consumption of technology largely has a negative effect on the environment and certain aspects of society-environment relations, technology still provides certain new avenues in ecopedagogy. For example, more people have access to information and collaboration through the internet and thus can engage in informal ecological education faster and in wider spheres. Similarly, community projects to install solar panels or wind turbines or simple technology that help farms to transition to agroecology are examples of the uses of technology in ecopedagogy.

== Sources ==
- Grigorov, S. 2012. International Handbook of Ecopedagogy for Students, Educators and Parents. A Project for a New Eco-Sustainable Civilization. BCSLDE, Sofia. Free for download at: www.bcslde.org
- Grigorov, S & Fleuri, R. 2012. Ecopedagogy: educating for a new eco-social intercultural perspective. Visão Global, UNOESC, Florianopolis. Free for download at: and https://www.academia.edu/4111655/Grigorov_S_and_Fleuri_R._2012._Ecopedagogy_educating_for_a_new_eco-social_intercultural_perspective._Visao_Global_UNOESC_Florianopolis
- Hawley E; Mocatta G; Milstein T, 2023, 'The Place of the Teacher: Environmental Communication and Transportive Pedagogy', Environmental Communication, 17, pp. 339 – 352, http://dx.doi.org/10.1080/17524032.2023.2189081
- Kahn, R. 2010. Love Hurts: Ecopedagogy Between Avatars and Elegies. Teacher Education Quarterly, Vol. 37, No. 4 (Fall).
- Kahn, R. 2009. Producing Crisis: Green Consumerism as an Ecopedagogical Issue. In J. Sandlin and P. McLaren (Eds.), Critical Pedagogies of Consumption: Living and Learning Beyond the Shopocalypse. New York: Routledge.
- Kahn, R. 2008. Towards Ecopedagogy: Weaving a Broad-based Pedagogy of Liberation for Animals, Nature and the Oppressed Peoples of the Earth. In A. Darder, R. Torres and M. Baltodano (Eds.), The Critical Pedagogy Reader (2nd ed.). New York: Routledge.
- Kahn, R. 2007. The Ecopedagogy Movement: From Global Ecological Crisis to Cosmological, Technological and Organizational Transformation in Education. Doctoral Dissertation (Committee: Douglas Kellner, Chair; Peter McLaren; and Steven Best), Graduate School of Education & Information Studies, University of California, Los Angeles.
- Kahn, R (2006). "The Educative Potential of Ecological Militancy in an Age of Big Oil: Towards a Marcusean ecopedagogy". Policy Futures in Education. 4 (1): 31–44. doi:10.2304/pfie.2006.4.1.31. S2CID 145592432.
- Leimbach T; Milstein T, 2022, 'Learning to change: Climate action pedagogy', Australian Journal of Adult Learning, 62, pp. 414 – 423, https://files.eric.ed.gov/fulltext/EJ1370386.pdf
- Milstein T, 2012, 'Survive, critique, and create: Guiding radical pedagogy and critical public scholarship with the discursive guideposts of ecopedagogy', Green Theory and Praxis Journal, 6, pp. 3 – 16, https://issuu.com/icasonlinepublications/docs/gtp_vol_6_issue_1_december_2012_revised_2
- Milstein T, 2020, 'Blooming in the doom and gloom: Bringing regenerative pedagogy to the rebellion', Journal of Sustainability Education, 23, http://www.susted.com/wordpress/content/blooming-in-the-doom-and-gloom-bringing-regenerative-pedagogy-to-the-rebellion_2020_04/
- Magalhaes, H. G. D. (2005). "Ecopedagogia y Utopia". Educação Temática Digital, Campinas. 7 (1): 53–60.
