= EDPnet =

edpnet is a Belgian telco provider that offers internet, fiber and telephony for both the professional and consumer market in Belgium and the Netherlands. Since 1999, the company established its name in the Belgian telecom market. The company has its own fully redundant network.

Company headquarters are located in Sint-Niklaas, Belgium and a branch office in Lelystad.

== Services ==
The edpnet services include:

Connectivity

- IP transit
- MPLS
- sdh/sonet
- vdsl2 & fiber
- Wavelengths

Voice

- Mobile
- Virtual PBX
- Voice trunks
- VoIP

Data center

- Domain names
- Shared server hosting
- Virtual private server hosting

Other products and services:

- Hardware services
