= Proteopedia =

3D encyclopedia of proteins and other molecules

- Company type: Nonprofit
- Website type: Online encyclopedia
- Available in: English
- Creators: Joel L. Sussman, Eran Hodis, and Jaime Prilusky
- Website: proteopedia.org
- Commercial: No
- Launched: 2007
- Current status: Perpetual work-in-progress

Proteopedia is a wiki, 3D encyclopedia of proteins and other molecules.

== Website ==
The site contains a page for all of the entries in the Protein Data Bank (PDB), as well as pages that are more descriptive of protein structures in general such as acetylcholinesterase, hemoglobin, and the photosystem II with a Jmol view that highlights functional sites and ligands. It employs a scene-authoring tool so that users do not have to learn JSmol script language to create customized molecular scenes. Custom scenes are easily attached to "green links" in descriptive text that display those scenes in JSmol. A web browser is all that is needed to access the site and the 3D information; no viewers are required to be installed.

Proteopedia was the winner of the 2010 award for the best website by The Scientist magazine.

== Licensing terms ==
All user-added content is free and covered by the GNU Free Documentation License. Proteopedia is hosted at the Israel Structural Proteomics Center at the Weizmann Institute of Science.
