= Eco-anxiety =

Chronic fear of environmental doom

Eco-anxiety expressed by youth about the future of the planet and what it means for them

Eco-anxiety (short for ecological anxiety), also known as eco-distress or climate anxiety, is a challenging emotional response to climate change and other environmental issues. The term ″eco-anxiety″ was invented by Véronique Lepaige, a French researcher in public health, in 1997. Extensive studies have been done on ecological anxiety since 2007, and various definitions remain in use. The condition is not a medical diagnosis and is regarded as a rational response to the reality of climate change; however, severe instances can have a mental health impact if left without alleviation. There is also evidence that eco-anxiety is caused by the way researchers frame their research and their narratives of the evidence about climate change: if they do not consider the possibility of finding any solution to overcome climate change and for individuals to make a difference, they contribute to this feeling of powerlessness.

Eco-anxiety is an unpleasant emotion, though it can also motivate useful behavior such as the gathering of relevant information. Yet it can also manifest as conflict avoidance, or even be "paralyzing". Some people have reported experiencing so much anxiety and fear about the future with climate change that they choose not to have children. Eco-anxiety has received more attention after 2017, and especially since late 2018 with Greta Thunberg publicly discussing her own eco-anxiety.

In 2018, the American Psychological Association (APA) issued a report about the impact of climate change on mental health. It said that "gradual, long-term changes in climate can also surface a number of different emotions, including fear, anger, feelings of powerlessness, or exhaustion". Generally this is likely to have the greatest impact on young people. Eco-anxiety that is now affecting young adults has been likened to Cold War fears of nuclear annihilation felt by baby boomers. Research has found that although there are heightened emotional experiences linked with the acknowledgement and anticipation of climate change and its impact on society, these are inherently adaptive. Furthermore, engaging with these emotional experiences leads to increased resilience, agency, reflective functioning and collective action. Individuals are encouraged to find collective ways of processing their climate related emotional experiences in order to support mental health and well-being. A 2024 systematic review of 35 studies involving 45,667 participants found that eco-anxiety was generally associated with symptoms of psychological distress, depression, anxiety, and stress. These findings emphasized the importance of recognizing the impact climate change can have on a person's mental health.

== Definition ==
Eco-anxiety has been defined in various different ways; a common feature of the different definitions is that they describe challenging emotional responses to climate change and other environmental issues.

The term eco-anxiety is said to have been coined by Glenn Albrecht who defined it as "a chronic fear of environmental doom". Another widely cited definition is: "the generalized sense that the ecological foundations of existence are in the process of collapse." Some scholars use the term eco-anxiety as a synonym for climate-anxiety, while others like to treat the terms separately. The APA has defined eco-anxiety as "the chronic fear of environmental cataclysm that comes from observing the seemingly irrevocable impact of climate change and the associated concern for one's future and that of next generations".

== Prevalence ==
Degrees of concern about the effects of climate change vary with political affiliation.

In 2023, almost six in ten respondents reported that a severe effect of climate change has already occurred where they live, with 38% expecting to be displaced from their homes in the next 25 years because of climate change.

In 2018, surveys conducted in the United States found that between 21% and 29% of Americans said they were "very" worried about the climate, which is double the rate of a similar study in 2015. A Yale 2023 survey found similar results, that climate change is distressing. This concept of climate or ecological anxiety and grief is far-reaching due to the extensive awareness about climate change that is made possible through technology and global communication.

Climate change is an ongoing global threat that is largely characterized by uncertainty and a lack of understanding. For this reason, anxiety and grief in humans is a natural and rational responses for those feeling fear or a lack of control. For example, these feelings could arise in people who are forced to leave their homes, deal with uncertainty about their future environment, or feel concern for the future harm of their children. Climate grief can be divided into three categories: physical ecological losses, the loss of environmental knowledge, and anticipated future losses.

=== Children and young adults ===
The condition has become especially common among children and young people – in 2021, in some universities, over 70% of students described themselves as suffering from eco-anxiety. However, as of early 2021, validated ways to assess the prevalence of climate or eco-anxiety were not well established. A September 2021 survey queried 10,000 young people from 10 countries across the world, finding that almost 60% were either very or extremely worried about climate change. Two thirds said they felt sad, afraid and anxious, while close to 40% reported they were hesitant to have children.

The people who surround children and young adults, like parents, guardians, teachers, and mentors, can have an impact on how they view climate change. There is research being done about how these groups of people should talk to children and young adults to prevent eco-anxiety in these populations, while still encouraging climate change mitigation practices.

=== Women ===
Women’s emergence of anxiety, worry, and fear in relation to climate change is associated not only with biological factors but also with sociocultural determinants that lie in the structural inequality. Women are at higher risk due to their imposed traditional gender roles and unequal access to power, information, and financial resources. Climate stressors, such as droughts, floods, or extreme heat, force women to work more just to gain water, energy, and food for their families, thereby consuming time that could have been used for earning a living or adapting.

An October 2021 report based on polling in the UK found that 78% of people surveyed expressed some degree of eco-anxiety. It found that women (45%) were substantially more likely to report high levels of eco-anxiety compared to men (36%). Similar observations have been reported worldwide, including European and African countries. Women with low socioeconomic status (SES) are particularly vulnerable to eco-anxiety. Countries facing adverse effects of climate conditions, such as India, the Philippines, and Nigeria, have recorded increasing rates of functional impact due to climate change distress. Heat stress is among the key aggravating factors in these areas, particularly for women who engage in agricultural activities or other outdoor jobs, which may result in forced relocation. A 2023 study claimed that eco-anxiety is more prevalent in women because 80% of climate migrants are women.

Climate change often plays a role in reproductive planning, as eco-anxiety increases women’s reluctance to childbearing due to worries about a bleak future and carbon footprint. A survey conducted by the New York Times in 2018 found that 33% of women who chose not to have children cited climate change as a reason. However, in nations where unpredictable climate change disrupts farming routines, families may opt for having more children to ensure an adequate labor supply for survival, rather than adhering to the trend of low fertility. This economic and cultural complexity indicates that, while women in the West might decide to go childfree as an environmental measure, women in low-SES, climate-vulnerable areas face tough choices on reproduction.

Climate anxiety and the question of whether to have children can also be intersected with racial discrimination, as underlined by Jade Sasser in Climate Anxiety and the Kid Question (2024). As racialized communities suffer from racism and are more vulnerable and unequally impacted by climate change, the question of whether to have children or not is all more difficult. This problem has received little attention and is revealing of the White centered society we live in.”

=== Indigenous peoples ===
Indigenous populations are especially vulnerable to eco-anxiety and other climate-caused emotional responses, because of their reliance on their land and land-based activities for their livelihood and well-being. A 2021 study found that indigenous populations who were exposed to environmental changes associated with climate change, like species loss, droughts, rising temperatures, and erratic weather patterns, were most likely to experience a decrease in mental wellbeing. This decrease can be expressed as eco-anxiety, but also as other climate related emotional responses, like eco-anger.

== Symptoms ==
Eco-anxiety can manifest in ways that cause physical symptoms and may exacerbate pre-existing mental health conditions. Symptoms include irritability, sleeplessness, inability to relax, loss of appetite, poor concentration, bouts of weakness, panic attacks, muscle tension and twitching. These symptoms are similar to the symptoms that someone diagnosed with generalized anxiety disorder might experience.

These symptoms are common in people who experience eco-anxiety. For example, a 2022 study commissioned by the American Academy of Sleep Medicine reported that "anxieties around climate change and environmental issues" caused insomnia for 70% of Americans.

Other mental and/or emotional symptoms include feelings of hopelessness and powerlessness, distancing oneself from or avoiding the issue, and feeling overwhelmed or suffocated.

== Treatment and response ==
The first step for therapists in treating eco-anxiety is realizing that a fearful response to a real condition is not pathological. Eco-anxiety is a completely normal response, even if the client finds it profoundly disturbing. Therapists need to take clients' fears about the situation seriously and "not assume they're a dysfunctional mental health problem or that a person suffering from eco-anxiety is somehow ill." In terms of treatment, individualistic models of mental health are "not designed to deal with collective trauma on a planetary scale".

Various non-clinical treatments, group work options, internet based support forums, and self-help books are available for people suffering from less severe psychological conditions. Some of the psychological impacts require no form of treatment at all, and can even be positive: for example, worry about climate change can be positively related to information-seeking and to a sense of being able to influence such problems.

One way to combat eco-anxiety is through beliefs about the effectiveness of personal actions. Eco-anxiety can be fueled in part by climate change helplessness, a form of learned helplessness applied to climate change fears. Because climate change is such an enormous issue with such dire consequences, an individual's actions may seem to make no difference in combatting the bigger issue. This can demotivate people from taking any pro-environmental actions at all. But, an intervention advocating for the effectiveness of individual actions can reduce feelings of apathy and anxiety associated with climate change helplessness. When people receive information describing how their personal actions impact the environment, they report less fear of climate change, and intend to make more sustainable choices, showing that climate change helplessness can be treated by beliefs in climate change efficacy.

In general, psychotherapists say that when individuals take action to combat climate change, this reduces anxiety levels by bringing a sense of personal empowerment and feelings of connection with others in the community. Many psychologists emphasize that in addition to action, there is a need to build emotional resilience to avoid burnout.

A 2021 literature review found that emotional responses to crisis can be adaptive when the individual has the capacity and support to process and reflect on this emotion. In these cases, individuals are able to grow from their experiences and support others. In the context of climate change, this capacity for deep reflection is necessary to navigate the emotional challenges that both individuals and societies face.

=== Further research ===
As eco-anxiety has gained traction and becomes more prevalent, one of the current hot topics in the scientific literature concerns how to define and assess eco-anxiety. Other future research may examine and develop ways for people to remain resilient in the face of climate change.

== Related emotional responses ==
In the field of ecopsychology, there are other climate-specific psychological impacts that are less well studied than eco-anxiety. They include, but are not limited to, eco-grief (or eco-depression), eco-anger, eco-guilt, and solastalgia.

=== Eco-anger ===
Eco-anger is frustration about climate change and the environmental changes that are caused by it. It can also be frustration towards certain groups, corporations, or countries that contribute to climate change. A study that separated the effects of eco-anxiety, eco-depression and eco-anger, found that eco-anger is the best for a person's wellbeing. This study also found that eco-anger is good for motivating participation in actions that combat climate change. A separate report from 2021 found that eco-anger was significantly more common among young people.

=== Eco-grief ===
After a Blue Origin spaceflight

It was among the strongest feelings of grief I have ever encountered. The contrast between the vicious coldness of space and the warm nurturing of Earth below filled me with overwhelming sadness. Every day, we are confronted with the knowledge of further destruction of Earth at our hands: the extinction of animal species, of flora and fauna... things that took five billion years to evolve, and suddenly we will never see them again because of the interference of mankind. It filled me with dread. My trip to space was supposed to be a celebration; instead, it felt like a funeral.

— William Shatner in his Boldly Go autobiography

Ecological grief (or eco-grief) is "the grief felt in relation to experienced or anticipated ecological losses, including the loss of species, ecosystems, and meaningful landscapes due to acute or chronic environmental change."

=== Eco-guilt ===
Eco-guilt is "guilt that arises when people think about times they have not met personal or societal standards for environmental behavior." This guilt can take the form of self-criticism, self-blame, self-examination, and/or self-torturing.

=== Solastalgia ===
Solastalgia is "the distress caused by the transformation and degradation of one's home environment." A 2019 study found that the number of people who experience solastalgia will increase as the rate of climate change also continues to increase. This is due to the fact that more people will see the effects of climate change on their home environments as climate change continues. It is becoming increasingly manifest that only the ecology suffers from climate change but also domains such as historic and cultural heritage, which are closely linked to sentiments of belonging and identity.

== Organizations ==
Several psychological organizations have been founded around climate psychology. Scholars have pointed out that there is a need for a systemic approach to provide various resources for people in relation to the mental health impacts of ecological problems and climate change. Some organizations, such as the Royal College of Psychiatrists, provide web based guidance to help caregivers assist children and young adults deal with their eco-anxiety.

Eco-anxiety support groups have also been created locally, nationally, and globally. These groups allow people to discuss their fears about climate change and receive advice from other members on how to address those fears. Peer-to-peer support groups have also emerged among individuals who have moved through the stages of grief into acceptance of climate impacts as ongoing and, to some degree, inevitable. Examples includes groups arising from the concepts of Deep adaptation (origin 2018) and Post-doom (origin 2019).

== See also ==
- Climate change – Human-caused changes to climate on Earth
- Climate change denial – Denial of the scientific consensus on climate change
- Climate change mitigation – Actions to reduce net greenhouse gas emissions to limit climate change
- Doomer – Person pessimistic or fatalistic about global problems
- Ecophobia – Feeling of powerlessness to prevent cataclysmic environmental change
- Effects of climate change on mental health – Aspect of climate change and society
- Nuclear anxiety – Fear of nuclear war
- Psychological impact of climate change – Aspect of climate change and society
- Psychology of climate change denial
- Public opinion on climate change
