= Ecological grief =

Anguish in response to ecological loss

After a Blue Origin spaceflight

It was among the strongest feelings of grief I have ever encountered. The contrast between the vicious coldness of space and the warm nurturing of Earth below filled me with overwhelming sadness. Every day, we are confronted with the knowledge of further destruction of Earth at our hands: the extinction of animal species, of flora and fauna... things that took five billion years to evolve, and suddenly we will never see them again because of the interference of mankind. It filled me with dread. My trip to space was supposed to be a celebration; instead, it felt like a funeral.

— William Shatner in his Boldly Go autobiography

Ecological grief (or eco-grief), or in particular climate grief, refers to the sense of loss that arises from experiencing or learning about environmental destruction or climate change. For example, scientists witnessing the decline of Australia's Great Barrier Reef report experiences of anxiety, hopelessness, and despair. Groups impacted heavily also include young people feeling betrayal from lack of environmental action by governments and indigenous communities losing their livelihoods.

Environmental disruption, such as the loss of biodiversity, or even the loss of inanimate environmental features like sea ice, cultural landscapes, or historic heritage can also cause negative psychological responses, such as ecological grief or solastalgia.

== Background and characteristics ==
Almost six in ten respondents reported that a severe effect of climate change has already occurred where they live, with 38% expecting to be displaced from their homes in the next 25 years because of climate change.

In the US, Democrats (blue) and Republicans (red) differ in views of the seriousness of addressing climate change, with the gap widening since the late 2010s mainly through Democrats' share increasing.

Usage of "grief" in response to ecological loss dates back to at least 1940, where Aldo Leopold used the term to refer to the pain of environmental loss. In A Sand County Almanac, Leopold wrote that "One of the penalties of an ecological education is to live alone in a world of wounds". The phenomena of ecological grief became more widespread in the 21st century along with the worsening climate crisis.

In 2018, Cunsolo and Ellis wrote that "grief is a natural and legitimate response to ecological loss, and one that may become more common as climate impacts worsen."

Australian philosopher Glenn Albrecht coined the term solastalgia, publishing the first academic paper on the idea in 2005. The term is derived from word root solacium (meaning "comfort") and the suffix -algia (meaning "pain"), suggesting a loss of comfort, and akin to the terms climate grief, ecological grief, and environmental melancholia. A 2022 article in The Atlantic described solastalgia as a response to "losing your home while staying in one place". The article said the word "seemed to tap into a kind of angst about life on a warming planet", the word inspiring an instrumental music track in the U.K., an album in Slovenia, and a porcelain representation.

A survey was conducted to measure the eco-guilt, anxiety and grief on mental health and its effect on the likeliness of pro-environmental behavior based on sociodemographic characteristics. Participants were asked a series of pro-environmental questions and asked to rate on a 5 point scale - 1 being almost never and 5 being always/almost always. The results indicated that women had higher overall score in each parameter of the study. Individuals living in rural areas displayed a greater sense of ecological grief compared to those living in suburban areas, which were allotted to the idea that those individuals experienced higher levels of first-hand loss.

Climate communicators may focus initially on communicating climate impacts and adaptation rather than the aspects of grief. Communicators such as the Yale Program on Climate Change Communication have often addressed the question of grief by stressing the importance of describing solutions. Attempting to channel climate anxiety into action for solutions is consistent with the approach described by Sherman H. Dryer, Director of Radio Productions at The University of Chicago, in his manual for World War II propaganda, in which radio communications about the war always end with a message on how the listener can support the war effort.

However, it is not clear that encouragement to channel anxiety and despair into action is an adequate response for people who have experienced concrete personal losses, such as Greenlanders who have had to euthanize sled dogs. Cunsolo, an ecologist active in Nunatsiavut, in Canada's Far North, described grappling with this question in an article titled, "To Grieve or Not to Grieve?".

Some discussions in the media have focused on the question of whether presenting the negative aspects of climate change is making people despair and give up. A 2016 Scientific American article posed the question, "Is a traumatic sense of loss freezing action against climate change?" In 2019, journalist Mike Pearl asserted that "people are suffering from what could be called 'climate despair', a sense that climate change is an unstoppable force that will render humanity extinct and renders life in the meantime futile." More recently, research has indicated that emotional responses to crisis and disaster are inherently adaptive, and with appropriate support in reflecting on and processing the experiences, these emotions can lead to resilience.

Climate change's impact on mental health can range from acute to chronic forms of distress. Common feelings were listed as a sense of powerlessness, despair, and grief. Three main have been attributed to ecological grief. 1) Past physical losses like firsthand extreme weather events, species extinction and habitat loss. 2) From the disruption of ones own cultural identity in relation to their surrounding environment. 3) The anticipation of future loss and climate anxiety.

== Symptoms ==
Some symptoms of ecological grief are not limited to but can include eco-anxiety, eco-guilt, and eco-paralysis. Research related to solastalgia is being recorded on an environmental distress scale by accessing grief that is associated with environmental loss and anxiety tied to anticipation of future losses.

=== Eco-anxiety ===
A 2020 survey by the American Psychological Association found that more than two-thirds of American adults said they had experienced "eco-anxiety". Habitual eco-anxiety is related to a strong emotional response to the environmental uncertainties of the future as well as related to the anger felt in response to others behavior towards the environment. A study was conducted measuring the coping mechanisms used in relation to class of eco-anxiety induced by ecological grief. A small sample size of 17 people living in central Europe who were considered to have increased sensitive values related to climate change were included. Individuals were selected based on their professions, studies, passions or effects from climate change they've had first-hand experience with. The results classified 6 classes of eco-anxiety including worry, empathy, conflicts related to frustration and anger, disturbance, mental health, and helplessness.

Although this particular study targeted individuals interested in climate change effects, the majority of coping mechanisms were problem focused and were most adaptive in leading into social support. The emerging model of climate grief suggests that people may process climate despair, or climate anxiety, through the stages of grief, and that forming social support networks is a part of this process. Eco-paralysis is an emotional response triggered by the shock of environmental events and the inability to give a physical response due to an overwhelming feeling of conflict. The negative consequences of eco-anxiety are the physical, emotional and behavioral responses that are not meaningfully beneficial regarding climate change.

=== Eco-guilt ===
Ecological guilt stems from the self-consciousness one's own actions are creating the problem. Collective guilt is viewed as the negative emotion people experience within their social ingroups as a whole. A manipulative study was conducted evaluating how the perceptions of global warming would influence feelings of collective guilt and likelihood of mitigating pro-environmental behaviors as a result. Through the experience of collective guilt it was hypothesized that it can help mitigate behaviors towards pro-environmental action. Higher instances of collective guilt were recorded when individuals were presented with the stance that humans have a 'minor' effect on climate change. Individuals were recorded to be more likely to use energy conservative practices and have higher willingness to pay 'green taxes' based on those feelings. Ecological guilt was also associated with less likeliness of pro-environmental action and increased levels of feelings of helplessness when human effects were attributed on a larger scale vs. minor.

== Impacts ==
=== Individual acts ===
On April 14, 2018, civil rights attorney David Buckel, 60, self-immolated without witnesses at about 6 a.m. in a Brooklyn, N.Y., park, after having sent an email notifying news organizations. His suicide letter stated, "My early death by fossil fuel reflects what we are doing to ourselves" and "Here is a hope that giving a life might bring some attention to the need for expanded action."

On April 22, 2022—Earth Day—Wynn Bruce, 50, self-immolated in front of the U.S. Supreme Court Building, apparently to protest climate inaction, after having edited a comment on a 2021 Facebook post about a course on climate change, writing "4/22/2022" next to a fire emoji.

=== Eco-tourism ===
As for the case of eco-tourism, there have been disheartening impacts made in Bama Yao Autonomous Country located in Guangxi, China. Bama Country is referred to as a longevity town due to the high percentage of centenarians residing in the area. Between the years of 2011-2019 tourism in Bama country had increased by 600% of up to 825,000 tourists. A study was conducted to evaluate emotional response of Bama residents experiencing ecological damage because of economic growth in tourism. Residents were reported to be saddened to notice that the Panyang River that was once used a source for drinking water, bathing, fishing, cooling and cooking is now very polluted as a result of exploitive physical changes done to environment for wellness tourism. Residents have reported feelings of helplessness, sadness and disappointment regarding coming to terms with and letting go of memories associated with the river. Residents say the depletion of the river has led to them losing part of their sense of belonging and has transpired into ecological grief.

Where there is economic development, there will be environmental damage, there is no best of both worlds. The natural environment used to be good, but you couldn't get enough food to eat - Bama resident

Findings argue that for some residents their ecological grief can be compensated with economic growth and opportunity for modernization of their lifestyles.

==== Place identity/attachment ====
Place attachment is the emotional connection established with a specific place that are drawn from personal experiences and landmarks associated with memories and emotions. Place identity is referred to as the sense of self and attachment established from living in a certain area. A Survey was conducted to establish whether individuals who hold a stronger place value with the Great Barrier Reef are more likely to show signs of ecological grief from habitat decline. Study used four groups, 1st group being local people, 2nd was tourist, 3rd was travel operators and 4th was fishery companies. When all groups were asked to rate "Thinking about coral bleaching makes me feel depressed" on a 1-10 scale, residents scored the highest of 7.14/10, followed by tourist with a 6.9/10, and commercial travel operators scoring 6.3/10, and fishery companies scoring a 4.66/10 The residents and tourists were next asked a series of 6 questions related to identity, resource pride, place attachment, aesthetic appreciation and lifestyle.

There was a positive correlation shown between having a high value of place identity and biodiversity between both tourists and residents Young people and females were more likely to report having feelings of "reef grief". The commercial operators and fisheries only reported high levels of ecological grief when worrying about the negative impacts of climate change. Overall place attachment is found to play a meaningful role in perceptions of climate change impacts.

== Groups of people affected more than average ==
=== Young people ===
In an open letter to the Swedish government, a group of psychologists and psychotherapists said, "A continued ecological crisis without an active solution focus from the adult world and decision makers poses a great risk that an increasing number of young people are affected by anxiety and depression."

A Boston University publication, The Brink, quotes a graduate student who "studied the collapse of Amazonian rain forests" and recommends a supportive approach, of time in nature and community, self care, and appreciation for small daily efforts on climate. One advocacy group manager says, "Those of us who work in the climate change world see young people mourning the losses that are coming ... These reactions are real and valid."

Renee Lertzman, a social scientist who "studies the mental health and emotional components of environmental degradation ... likens the climate-related stress now plaguing teenagers and 20-somethings to the oppressive Cold War fears that gripped young baby boomers, many of whom came of age under the threat of nuclear annihilation."

Previous studies on children show that they feel a sense of betrayal by the inaction of adults in the fight for climate change. A study done on climate anxiety in children and young adults collected data from 10,000 individuals from countries in Australia, Brazil, Finland, France, India, Nigeria, Philippines, Portugal, the UK, and the USA all between ages of 16–25 years old. Key objectives were first evaluating how teens and young adults categorize emotional, cognitive, and functional responses to climate change. Secondly was looking at how they appraise government action towards climate change and lastly determining whether there is a relationship between emotional response to climate change and government action. More than 60% of participants said they were "very" worried about climate change and 45% reported the climate anxiety affects their daily life functioning. Reports of climate change affecting their daily life functioning were higher in poverty stricken areas where climate change is affecting livelihood practices. 30% reported they feel that the government is taking environmental concerns seriously. Overall most countries reported greater feelings of betrayal than of reassurance from government support. Positive correlation was shown between negative emotions and functional response in relation to feeling betrayal from government agencies.

=== Scientists ===
Scientists who study climate change and biodiversity loss have formed support groups online and at institutions to help with dealing with ecological grief. Many scientists have seen the impact of climate change and biodiversity loss firsthand often over very short periods of time.

I'd just recruited a PhD student to study fish behaviour, and between the time of recruiting him and getting out for the first field season, the Great Barrier Reef died – 80% of the corals where we work were gone, and most of the fish that lived there also moved on. I told him in the interview that his visit was going to be this most wonderful experience, and it was just a tragic graveyard of historic coral reef life.

— Steve Simpson, professor of marine biology and global change at the University of Exeter.

Scientists internalise their emotions, move to other fields of work, work on protecting parts of the environment they study or shift to finding ways to help the environment adapt. Some scientists see the need for new rituals to celebrate their love for the environment.

=== Indigenous communities ===
Indigenous communities may have grief over loss of identity because it is so closely connected to the environment and the knowledge that the environment will degrade further, as well as the sadness of watching others experience environment-related trauma which they have also experienced.

Indigenous people residing in Arctic regions are considered to be the most vulnerable in response to ecological losses due that climate change has been most impactful on Arctic regions.

We are people of the sea ice. And if there's no more sea ice, how do we be people of the sea ice?

— Inuit elder

=== Relationship with worldview ===
People express differing intensities of concern and grief about climate change depending on their worldview, with those holding egoistic (defined as people who mostly care about oneself and their health and wellbeing), social-altruistic (defined as people who express concern for others in their community like future generations, friends, family and general public) and biospheric (defined as people who are concerned about environmental aspects like plants and animals) views differing markedly. People who belong to the biospheric group expressed the most concern about ecological grief i.e., a form of grief related to worries about the state of the world's environment, and engage in ecological coping, – which includes connection to community, expression of sorrow and grief, shifting focus to controllable aspects of climate change and being close to nature – people who belonged to the social-altruistic group engaged in ecological coping but did not express ecological stress.

== As a secondary impact of climate adaptation on women ==
Grief may be directly associated with the secondary impacts of climate adaptation. These secondary impacts have been observed in women according to the Intergovernmental Panel on Climate Change (IPCC).

The IPCC AR5 WG2 TS notes that

Women often experience additional duties as laborers and caregivers as a result of extreme weather events and climate change, as well as responses (e.g., male outmigration), while facing more psychological and emotional distress, reduced food intake, adverse mental health outcomes due to displacement, and in some cases increasing incidences of domestic violence.

== See also ==
- Eco-anxiety
- Effects of climate change on mental health
- Five Years (David Bowie song)
- Nuclear anxiety
