= Climate psychology =

Field of psychology

Climate psychology is a field that aims to further our understanding of our psychological processes' relationship to the climate and our environment. It aims to study both how the climate can impact our own thoughts and behaviors, as well as how our thoughts and behaviors impact the climate. This field often focuses on climate change, both in our reaction to it and how our behaviors can be changed in order to minimize the impact humanity has on the climate. These behavior changes include: engaging with the public about climate change, contributing at a personal, communal, cultural and political level by supporting effective change through activists, scientists, and policy makers, and finally nurturing psychological resilience to the destructive impacts climate change creates now and in the future.

Climate psychology includes many subfields and focuses including: the effects of climate change on mental health, the psychological impact of climate change, the psychological explanation of climate inaction, and climate change denial. Climate psychology is a sub-discipline of environmental psychology.

== History ==
The origins of climate psychology can be traced back to the work of psychoanalyst Harold Searles and his work on the unconscious factors that influence the estrangement of people from the rest of nature. It has also been strongly related to the field of ecopsychology, as Sigmund Freud tied the interests of the ego to the natural world. Due to the increase in society-wide acceptance of the dangers of climate change, there has been greater interest in understanding the psychological processes underlying the resistance to taking appropriate action, and in particular, the phenomenon of climate change denial. More recently, a literature base by climate psychologists has started to focus on the powerful emotions associated with climate change and planetary-wide biodiversity loss.

== Academic discipline ==
Climate psychology is a trans-disciplinary approach to research and practice. It focuses on the society-wide reluctance to take appropriate action in relation to the escalating threat of climate change. It seems the problem as requiring a deeper approach, that examines our resistance to knowing and acting, rather than seeing it as an "information deficit" to be treated by cognitive or behavioral approaches. It stresses the significance of human emotions, identities and cultural assumptions. Furthermore, it acknowledges the human subject as nested within their social and ecological context.

In order to meet its aims and develop its approach, climate psychology draws on a broad range of perspectives, including: literature, philosophy, world religions, the arts, humanities and systems thinking. The core of the approach is based on various psychotherapeutic traditions and psycho-social studies, allowing climate psychologists to understand the unconscious or unacknowledged emotions and processes influencing people's thoughts, motivations and behaviors. This applies especially to these processes that manifest in the broader context of the wider society and culture.

As of 2020, the discipline of climate psychology had grown to include many subfields. This is in response to the spread of, what has recently been called, climate anxiety, which is a manifestation of the decades-old understanding of eco-anxiety. Climate psychologists are working with the United Nations, national and local governments, with corporations, NGOs, and individuals.

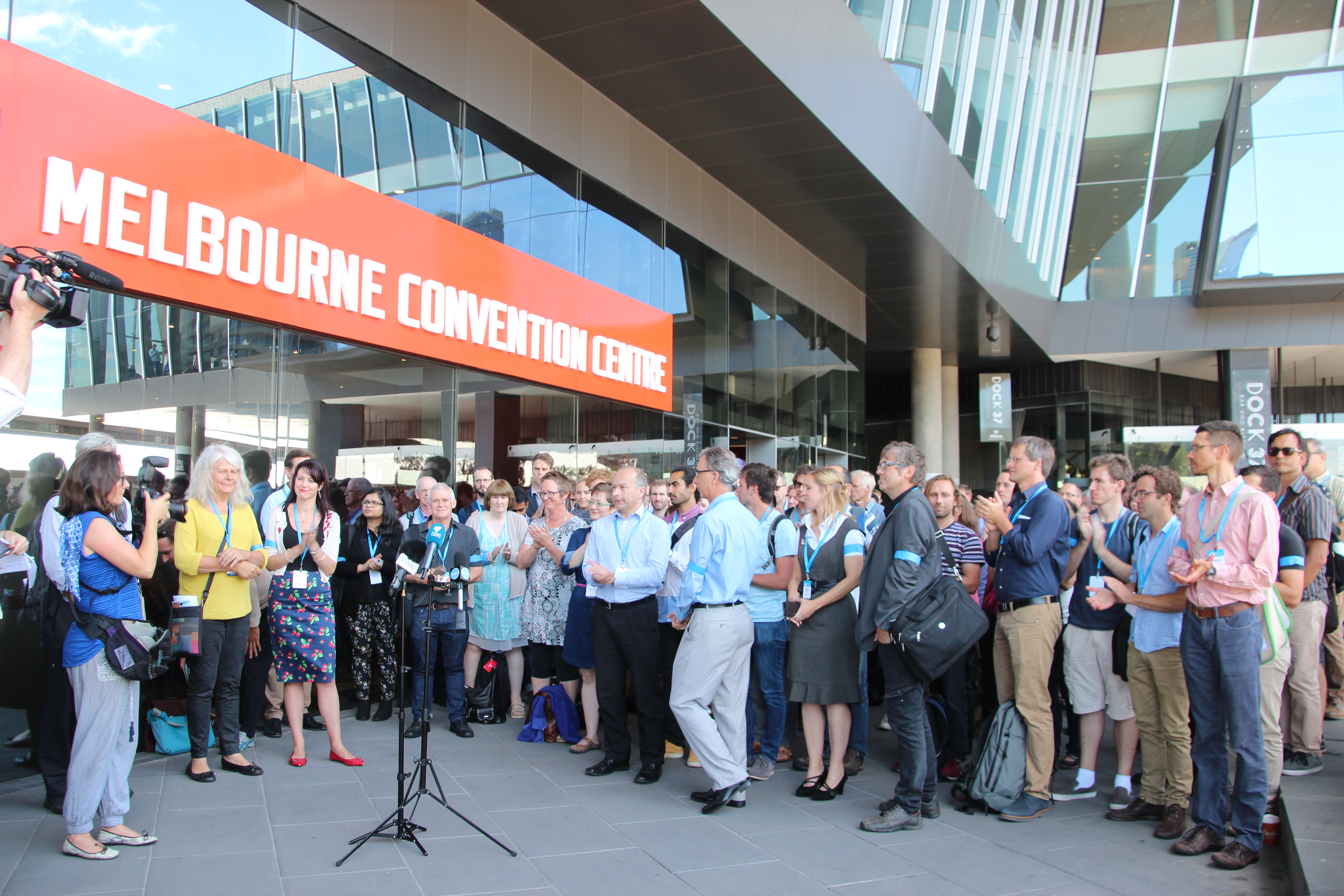
Climate scientists protesting in 2016 against cuts to funding for climate change research

=== Climate psychology in practice ===
In recent years, climate psychologists are facilitating support groups for activists, particularly those active in the support of pro-environmental behaviors across society. Climate psychologists have also engaged directly with climate activists, and even engaged in climate activism themselves. For example, in August 2022, scientists and their colleagues came together to protest outside of the Department of Business, Energy, and Industrial Strategy in London. During this time, as shown on the news, many climate scientists were having mental breakdowns and showing extreme signs of emotional turmoil and anguish. Climate psychologists over the years have watched not only scientists go through this environmental change, seeing how it has negatively impacted millions. They support groups through behavioral practices and studies to help obtain precise data and comprehension from person to person within these activist groups.

The United States Agency for International Development (USAID) reports that roughly 971 million individuals are residing in regions with moderate to high exposure to climate hazards due to industrial development, environmental exploitation, and excessive consumerism, particularly in the Asia-Pacific and South Asia regions. In response to the issues and difficulties resulting from climate change, the Psychological Association of the Philippines (PAP) is actively providing psychological aid during natural disasters and catastrophic events. In addition, psychologists around the globe encourage networking and connections to maintain knowledge exchange and create a community of climate action proponents to assure that all individuals have access to the aid and amenities needed in areas currently under pressure from the ongoing climate crisis.

== Climate and mental health ==
The climate can have various impacts on mental health. For example, increased temperature can be linked to a worsening of a variety of mental health issues such as aggression, anxiety, dementia, mood, and suicide. Especially when combined with increased humidity, heat waves not only worsen existing mental health issues but also reduce the effectiveness of some psychotropic medications. The worsening of these symptoms can lead to increases in crime rates and hospital admissions rates during heat waves. The increased prevalence of natural disasters can also cause mental distress which can cause PTSD in many patients, which is a pressing concern for some climate psychologists. Natural disasters have also been linked to acute stress disorder, drug abuse disorder, and depression in some people.

Climate change may also result in socioeconomic impacts; the associated economic hardship can negatively impact mental health, leading to stress and depression. Workers often face worse conditions due to climate change leading to increased risk of injury. The negative impacts on physical health can then lead to decreases in mental health as well. Workers may then become demoralized and lose interest in their work as a result of worsened mental health. These socioeconomic impacts can also lead to disproportionate impacts on minorities and repressed groups within a society. For example women are often disproportionately impacted compared to men in the aftermath of a natural disaster.

Due to the impacts of climate change on mental health, psychologists and social workers have begun to take climate into account when assessing patients. This includes reaching out to the community and applying psychological principals to decrease climate change and to address climate anxiety in clinical sessions. Psychologists may council patients with climate related anxiety and attempt to shift those anxieties into positive changes. This form of treatment has been encouraged to be a method of supporting wellbeing instead of solely relieving distress from patients' suffering.

== Psycho-analytical approaches ==
Psycho-analytical approaches are approaches based on the ideas of Sigmund Freud. They focus on how people respond to anxiety, a response which in turn may trigger psychological defense mechanisms. The psychological defenses triggered will often define how that person then reacts to climate change. Climate psychologists use this to explain reactions such as climate change denial, apathy, and inaction in towards climate change.

Psychologists consider how coping responses can be adaptive or maladaptive, and climate psychologists use environmental impact of a behavior to determine the adaptivity of the response. For example, climate psychologists might ask if responses promote positive psychological adjustment and stimulate appropriate and proportional pro-environmental action, or do they serve to justify the individual in their inaction and allow them to refrain from the necessary, radical changes?

Recent research highlights that people's underlying values play a key role in motivating climate-friendly behavior. Individuals who hold strong biospheric values—those emphasizing concern for nature and the environment—are more likely to support climate policies and adopt sustainable behaviors, whereas egoistic or hedonic values can reduce such engagement.

== Psycho-social approaches ==
A psycho-social approach to climate psychology examines the interplay between internal, psychological factors and external, sociocultural factors- such as values, beliefs, and norms- in people's responses to climate change. For example, researchers have looked at how cultures with a history of water scarcity in the environment tend to prioritize long-term thinking and reject indulgence. Researchers have also looked at how people's values shift in response to hearing news about climate change, such as worsening water scarcity.

Some psycho-social approaches use qualitative methodology for understanding the lived experience of research participants, which has been adopted by researchers seeking to investigate how climate change and environmental destruction are experienced by different groups across society. In this case, 'lived experience' refers to the feelings, thoughts and imaginations and the meaning frames which both affect and are effected by those experiences.

Coping responses to impending climate destabilization are psycho-social phenomena, culturally sanctioned and maintained by social norms and structures, not simply isolated psychological processes. For example, modern mass consumerism is dictated by the needs of a globalized, deregulated economy, yet it is one of the driving forces of climate change. It has been suggested that this "culture of un-care" performs an ideological function, insulating consumers from experiencing too much anxiety and moral disquiet.

Cultural mechanisms also support ways of down-regulating the powerful feelings that would otherwise be elicited by the awareness of potential threats. These include strong, embedded cultural assumptions such as entitlement, exceptionalism, and faith in progress. Entitlement is the belief that certain groups or species deserve more than others and is embedded in the unequal relations governing developed and developing human societies. Exceptionalism is the idea that one's species, nation, ethnic group or individual self is special and therefore absolved from the rules that apply to others, giving license to breach natural limits of resource consumption. Faith in progress, a key element of post-industrial ideology, results in a conviction that science and technology can solve every problem, therefore encouraging wishful thinking and false optimism.

Many people perceive unfairness in how they are affected by climate change. This is often caused by the wealth inequality correlated with climate change. In other words, those who experience more inequality also experience worse impacts from climate change. Lack of fairness is then perpetuated as many wealthier people have a disproportionate negative impact on the environment due to the direct correlation between wealth and a person's carbon footprint. This perceived lack of fairness can then lead to increased radicalization of a person's belief's about climate change according to psycho-social models of political radicalization.
