= Psychological impact of climate change =

Aspect of climate change and society

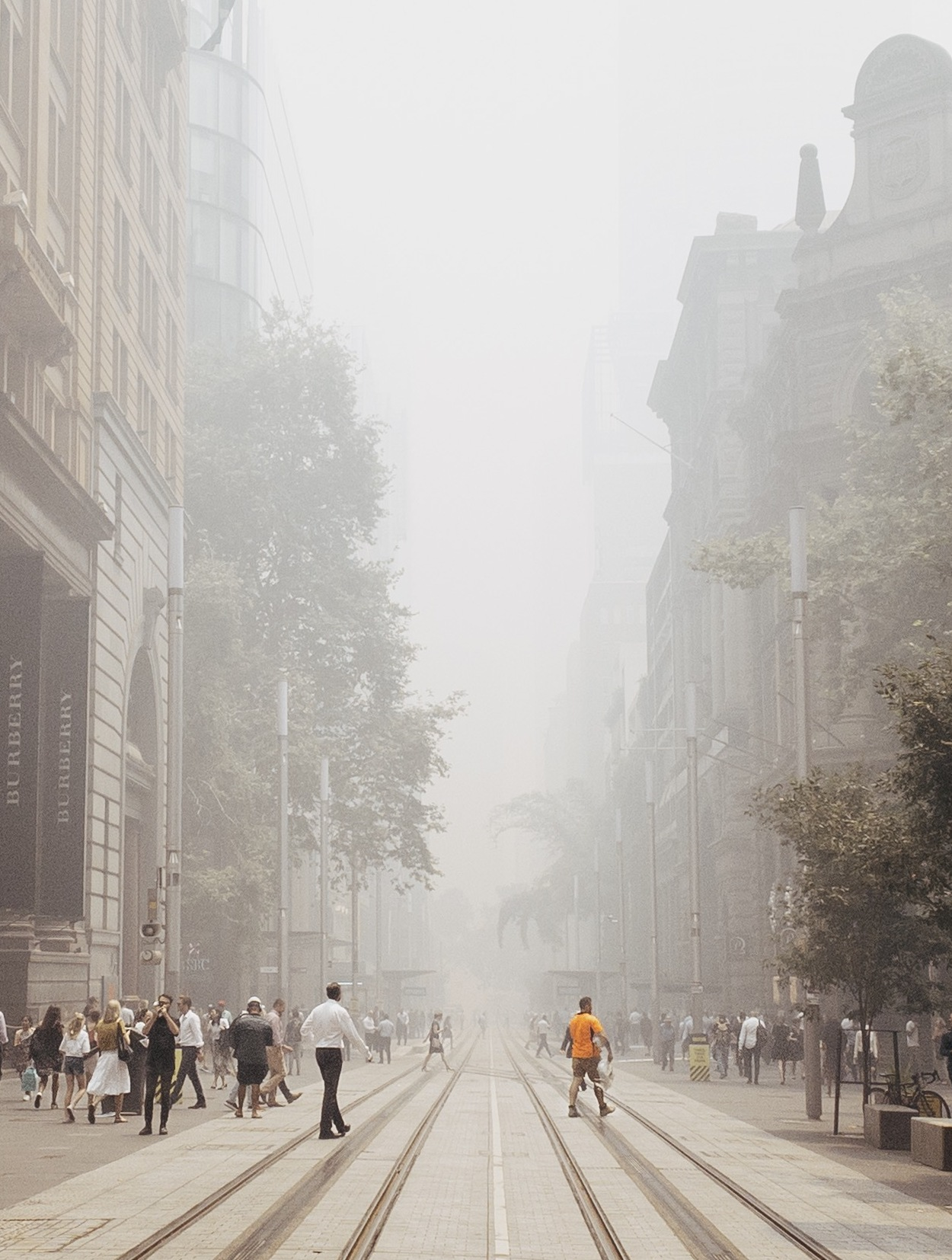
Smoke in Sydney (Australia) from large bushfires in 2019 affected some people's mental health in a direct way. The likelihood of wildfires is increased by climate change.

The psychological impacts of climate change concerns effects that climate change can have on individuals' mental and emotional well-being. They may also relate to more generalized effects on groups and their behaviors, such as the urge to migrate from affected areas of the globe to areas perceived as less affected. These impacts can manifest in various ways and affect people of all ages and backgrounds.

The effects of climate change on mental health and wellbeing are being documented as the consequences of climate change become more tangible and impactful. This is especially the case for vulnerable populations and those with pre-existing serious mental illness. There are three broad pathways by which these effects can take place: directly, indirectly or via awareness. The direct pathway includes stress-related conditions caused by exposure to extreme weather events. These include post-traumatic stress disorder (PTSD). Scientific studies have linked mental health to several climate-related exposures. These include heat, humidity, rainfall, drought, wildfires and floods. The bushfires in Australia had a direct effect on its citizens' mental health with a PTSD rate of 3.6% in comparison to its previous 2.4%. The indirect pathway can be disruption to economic and social activities. An example is when an area of farmland is less able to produce food. The third pathway can be of mere awareness of the climate change threat, even by individuals who are not otherwise affected by it. This especially manifests in the form of anxiety over the quality of life for future generations.

Efforts to understand the psychological impacts of climate change have antecedents in work from the 20th century and even earlier, making evidence-based links to the changing physical and social environment resulting from accelerated human activity dating from the Industrial Revolution. Empirical investigation of psychological impacts specifically related to climate change began in the late 20th century and have intensified in the first decade of the 21st century. From the early 2010s, psychologists were increasingly calling on each other to contribute to the understanding of psychological impacts from climate change. Academic professionals, medical professionals, and various actors are actively seeking to understand these impacts, provide relief, make accurate predictions, and assist in efforts to mitigate and adapt to global warming, including attempts to pause activity leading to further warming.

There are several channels through which climate change can impact a person's mental health, including direct impacts, indirect effects, and awareness of the issue. Specific populations, such as communities of color, children, and adolescents, are particularly vulnerable to these mental health impacts. There are many exceptions, but generally, it is people in developing countries who are more exposed to the direct effects and economic disruption caused by climate change.

The psychological effects of climate change may be investigated within the field of climate psychology or picked up in the course of treatment of mental health disorders. Non-clinical approaches, campaigning options, internet-based support forums, and self-help books may be adopted by those not overwhelmed by climate anxiety. Some psychological impacts may not receive any form of treatment at all and could be productive—for example, when concern about climate change is channeled into information gathering and seeking to influence related policy with others. The psychological effects of climate may receive attention from governments and others involved in creating public policy, by means of campaigning and lobbying by groups and NGOs.

== History ==
As of 2020, the discipline of climate psychology has grown to include many subfields. Social psychologists have published studies on people's psychological responses to climate change news, such as how it might shift values away from indulgence and toward long-term thinking. In addition, climate psychologists have been working with the United Nations, national and local governments, corporations, NGOs, and individuals. In 2022, the first report on how climate change impacts psychosocial well-being was detailed.

== Pathways ==
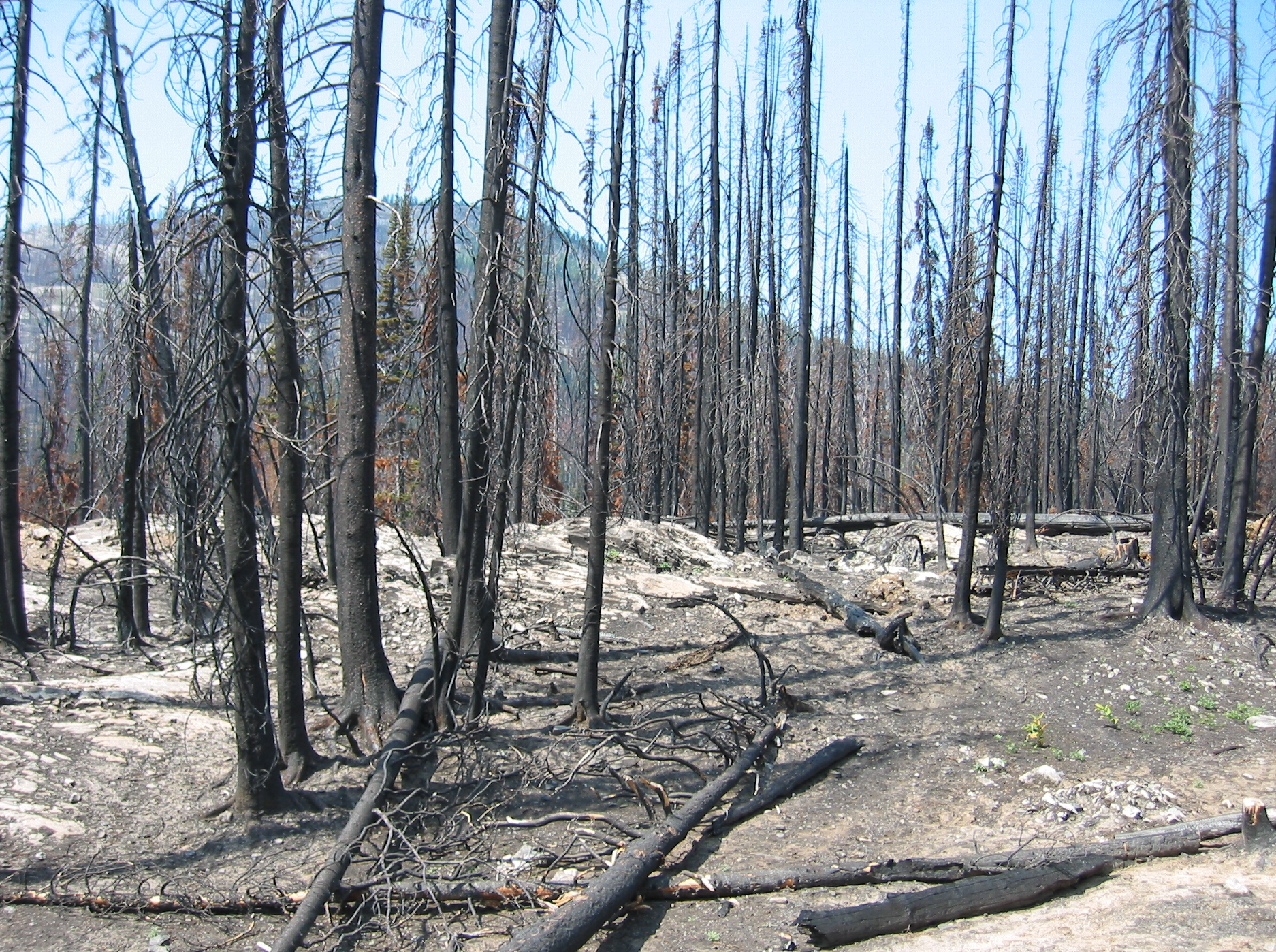
Seeing reports and images from massive wildfires, which were made more frequent due to climate change, can leave psychological impacts on people (charred landscape after crown fire in the North Cascades National Park, United States).

Three causal pathways by which climate change causes psychological effects have been suggested: direct, indirect, or via psychosocial awareness. (Note: Various reviews use different nomenclature to designate the three causal pathways. e.g. Doherty & Clayton (2011), designate the 'Awareness' pathway using the term "Indirect impact", while grouping 'Indirect' effects via financial and social disruption under "Psychosocial" .) In some cases, people may be affected via more than one pathway at once.

There are three broad channels by which climate change affects people's mental state: directly, indirectly, or unconsciously. The direct channel includes stress-related conditions being caused by exposure to extreme weather events, such as cyclones and wildfires, causing conditions such as PTS and anxiety disorder. However, psychological impacts can also occur through less intense forms of climate change, such as through rising temperatures, leading to increased aggression. The indirect pathway occurs via disruption to economic and social activities, such as when an area of farmland becomes infertile due to desertification, a decrease in tourism due to damage to the landscape, or interruptions to transport. This can lead to increased stress, depression, and other psychological conditions such as anxiety. The third channel can be through conscious or unconscious awareness of the climate change threat, even by individuals not otherwise affected by it. This can be, for instance, feeling intimidated by the threats of food and water insecurity posed by climate change, which can lead to conflict. In general, populations living at sea level and in the Southern Hemisphere tend to be more exposed to economic disruption caused by climate change. Whereas recently identified climate-related psychological conditions like "eco-anxiety," resulting from emergent awareness of the threat, can affect people across the planet.

=== Direct impact ===
Almost six in ten respondents reported that a severe effect of climate change has already occurred where they live, with 38% expecting to be displaced from their homes in the next 25 years because of climate change.

Exposure to extreme weather events, such as hurricanes, floods, or high temperatures associated with drought and wildfires, can cause various emotional disorders. Most commonly, this is short-term stress, from which people can often rapidly recover. But sometimes chronic conditions set in, especially among those who have been exposed to multiple events, such as post-traumatic stress, somatoform disorder, or long-term anxiety. A swift response by authorities to restore a sense of order and security can substantially reduce the risk of long-term psychological impact for most people. However, individuals already suffering from mental ill health and who do not receive the required attention when weather conditions disrupt services may face further decline.

==== Increased temperatures and heatwaves ====
Several studies have shown that there is a correlation between elevated temperatures and psychiatric hospital admissions for a range of mental and neurological disorders (dementia, mood disorders, anxiety disorders, schizophrenia, bipolar disorder, somatoform disorders, and disorders of psychological development).

Mortality has also been found to be influenced by high ambient temperatures for people living with mental illness and neurological conditions. Another European study supports this finding with increased mortality risk for people with psychiatric disorders during heat waves from 2000 to 2008 in Rome and Stockholm, particularly for older people (75+) and women. Projections of mortality under different climate change scenarios in China also estimate increasing trends in heat-related excess mortality for mental disorders but a decreasing trend in cold-related excess mortality.

Several studies from Asia found that fluctuating temperatures influenced mental health and well-being, impacting productivity and livelihoods. For example, long-term exposure to high and low temperatures in Taiwan resulted in a 7% increase of major depressive disorder incidence per 1 °C increment in regions with an average annual temperature above the median 23 °C.

The single best-studied connection between weather and human behavior is that between temperature and aggression, which has been investigated in laboratory settings, by historical study, and extensive fieldwork. Various reviews conclude that high temperatures cause people to become bad-tempered, leading to increased physical violence, including domestic violence, especially in areas of mixed ethnic groups. There has been academic dispute regarding the degree to which the excess violence is caused by climate change, as opposed to natural temperature variability. The psychological effects of unusually low temperatures, which climate change can also cause in some parts of the world, must be more thoroughly documented. However, evidence suggests that, unlike unusually high temperatures, they are less likely to lead to increased aggression.

===== Suicide rates =====
Temperature has also been associated with self-harm and suicide rates. Using data from the US and Mexico, suicide rates were found to increase by 0.7% and 3.1%, respectively, for a 1 °C increase in monthly average temperature. Increasing temperatures are associated with increases in aggressive behavior and rising crime rates, leading to increases in homicides and assaults, as well as increased suicide rates in young men and older adults. Higher ambient temperatures are also associated with emergency department visits for mental health, suicides, and self-reporting of poor mental health.

It is projected that in the coming decades, suicide rates in the United States and Mexico will increase due to increasing ambient temperatures. Assuming that there is no reduction in the current rate of greenhouse gas emissions, it is projected that by 2050, there will be an additional 9,000 to 40,000 suicides in the United States and Mexico, which is a rate comparable to the one estimated after the impact of economic recessions, suicide prevention programs, and gun restriction laws. The study also showed an increase in depressive language and suicidal ideation used on social media posts correlated with an increase in temperatures. In India, higher temperatures during growing seasons for crops have also been associated with increased suicides, at a rate of an additional 67 deaths per year per 1 °C additional degree.

==== Wildfires ====
Studies from North America have shown that experiences of evacuation and isolation due to wildfires, as well as feelings of fear, stress, and uncertainty, contributed to acute and long-term negative impacts on mental and emotional well-being. Prolonged smoke events were linked to respiratory problems, extended time indoors, and disruptions to livelihood and land-based activities, which negatively affected mental well-being. Similar findings were reported in an Australian study, with increased rates of stress, depression, anxiety and posttraumatic stress disorder being correlated with bushfire exposure severity.

==== Floods ====
An Australian study in rural communities concluded that the threat of drought and flood are intertwined and contributed to decreased well-being from stress, anxiety, loss, and fear. A cohort study from the UK looking at the long-term impact of flooding found psychological morbidity persisted for at least three years after the flooding event.

==== Increased carbon dioxide concentrations ====
Drivers of climate change may also have a physiological effects on the brain, in addition to their psychological impacts. By the end of the 21st century people could be exposed to indoor CO_{2} levels of up to 1400 ppm, triple the amount commonly experienced outdoors today. This may cut humans' basic decision-making ability indoors by ~25% and complex strategic thinking by ~50% due to carbon dioxide toxicity.

=== Indirect pathway ===
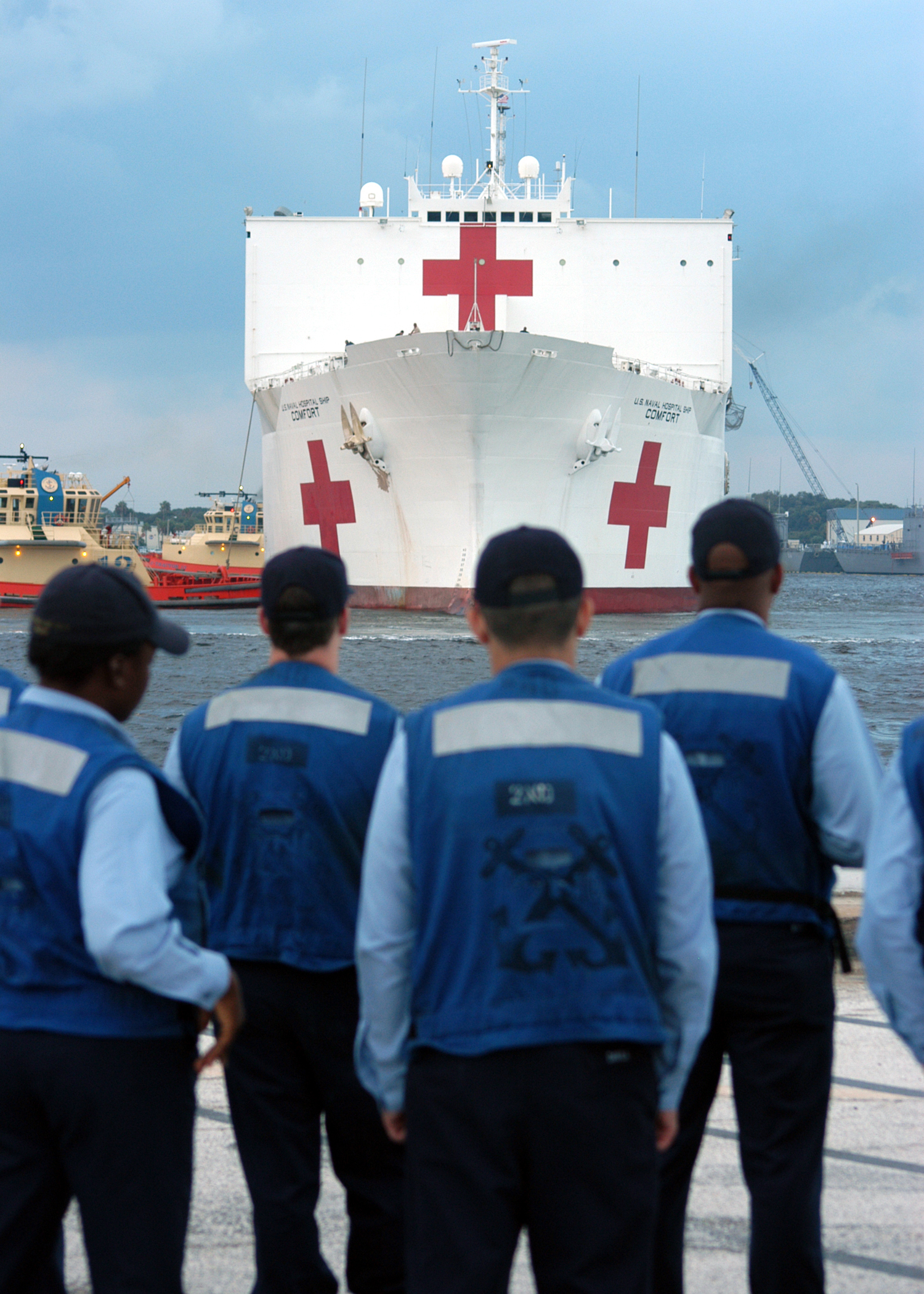
The USNS Comfort arriving with relief after Hurricane Katrina. Rapid assistance for those affected by extreme weather can mitigate long term psychological impact.

Climate change significantly impacts people's financial stability in all parts of the world. Climate change reduces agricultural output and makes an area unattractive for tourism. This can cause significant stress, which in turn can lead to depression and other adverse psychological conditions. Consequences can be especially severe if financial stress is coupled with considerable disruption to social life, such as relocation to camps. For example, in the aftermath of Hurricane Katrina, the suicide rate for the general population rose by about 300%, but for those who were displaced and had to move into trailer parks, it rose by over 1400%. Effective inter-governmental interventions, especially in some less prosperous countries in the global south, can alleviate an immediate crisis.

Mental health and physical health are largely intertwined, so any climate change-related effects on physical health can directly affect mental health. Environmental disruption, such as the loss of bio-diversity, or even the loss of environmental features like sea-ice, cultural landscapes, or historic heritage can also cause negative psychological responses, such as ecological grief or solastalgia.

=== Unconscious awareness ===
Information about the risks posed by climate change, even to those not yet directly affected by it, can cause long-lasting psychological conditions, such as anxiety or other forms of distress. This can especially affect children, and has been compared to nuclear anxiety which occurred during the Cold War. Conditions such as eco-anxiety are very rarely severe enough to require clinical treatment. While unpleasant and thus classified as negative, such conditions have been described as valid rational responses to the reality of climate change.

== Impacts on mental health ==
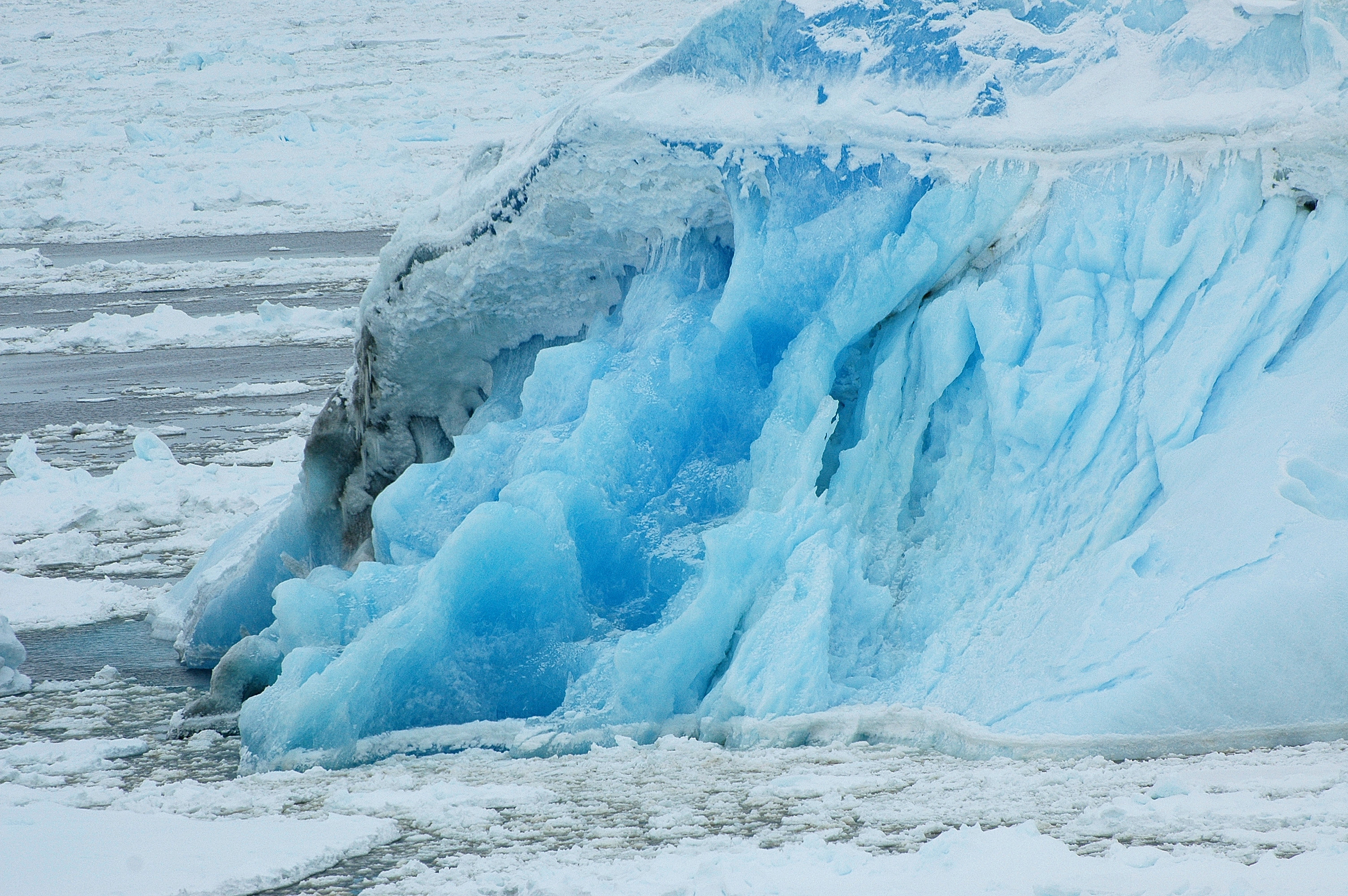
The loss of sea-ice can have psychological impact on people who value it, resulting in Eco-grief. "We are people of the sea ice. And if there's no more sea ice, how do we be people of the sea ice?" – Inuk elder.

As climate change becomes increasingly evident and threatening to both the biosphere and human livelihoods, the feelings aroused in response are a focus for exploration. Emotions such as feelings of loss and anxiety, grief, and guilt appear as typical responses to perceived threats posed by climate change. Such emotions have been collectively referred to in the literature as climate distress. Climate change is associated with increased frequency and severity of extreme weather events. The impacts of discrete events such as natural disasters on mental health have been demonstrated through decades of research showing increased levels of PTSD, depression, anxiety, substance abuse, and even domestic violence following the experience of storms.

Emotional reactions to climate change are being studied. Feelings of loss can originate in anticipation of impending catastrophe and after actual destruction. The corresponding 'anticipatory mourning' has been explored. The feelings of grief and distress in response to ecological destruction have elsewhere been termed 'solastalgia,' and the response to pollution of the local environment has been termed 'environmental melancholia.'

However, feelings in response to climate change and its broader ramifications can be unconscious or not fully recognized. The result is feelings of despair and unease, particularly in young people. It can surface in those attending therapy. This makes it difficult to give name to what one is feeling, so it is generally termed as eco-anxiety—particularly when this negative effect takes on more intense forms such as sleeping disorders and ruminative thinking. Rather than see eco-anxiety as a pathology requiring treatment, Bednarek has suggested that it be construed as an adaptive, healthy response.

It is often difficult to conceptualize emotions in response to the unseen or intangible aspects of climate change. Theoretical approaches have suggested this is due to climate change being part of a greater construct than human cognition can fully comprehend, known as a 'hyperobject.' One of the techniques used by climate psychologists to engage with such 'unthought knowns' and their unconscious, unexplored emotional implications is 'social dreaming.'

Awareness of climate change and its destructive impact, happening in both the present and future, is often very overwhelming. Literature investigating how individuals and society respond to crisis and disaster found that when there was space to process and reflect on emotional experiences, these increased emotions became adaptive. Furthermore, these adaptations then led to growth and resilience. Doppelt suggested 'transformational resilience' as a property of social systems, in which adversities are catalysts for new meaning and direction in life, leading to changes that increase both individual and community wellbeing above previous levels.

== Impacts on specific groups ==
Degrees of concern about the effects of climate change vary with political affiliation.

People express differing intensities of concern and grief about climate change depending on their worldview, with those holding egoistic (defined as people who mostly care about oneself and their health and wellbeing), social-altruistic (defined as people who express concern for others in their community like future generations, friends, family and general public) and biospheric (defined as people who are concerned about environmental aspects like plants and animals) views differing markedly. People who belong to the biospheric group expressed the most concern about ecological stress or grief, i.e., a form of grief related to worries about the state of the world's environment, and engage in ecological coping – ecological coping includes connection to community, expression of sorrow and grief, shifting focus to controllable aspects of climate change and being close to nature – people who belonged to the social-altruistic group engaged in ecological coping but did not express ecological stress.

=== Indigenous communities ===
Climate change has devastating effects on Indigenous peoples' psychological wellbeing as it impacts them directly and indirectly. As their lifestyles are often closely linked to the land, climate change directly impacts their physical health and financial stability in quantifiable ways. There is also a concerning correlation between severe mental health issues among Indigenous peoples worldwide and environmental changes. The connection and value Indigenous cultures ascribe to land means that damage to or separation from it directly impacts mental health. For many, their country is interwoven with psychological aspects such as their identity, community, and rituals.

Inadequate government responses that neglect Indigenous knowledge further worsen the adverse psychological effects linked to climate change. This produces the risk of cultural homogenization due to global adaptation efforts to climate change and the disruption of cultural traditions due to forced relocation.

==== Inuit communities ====
Qualitative studies reporting the unique mental health impacts of climate change on Inuit communities in Canada have described a loss of place-based solace, land-based activities such as hunting, and cultural identity due to changing weather and local landscapes.

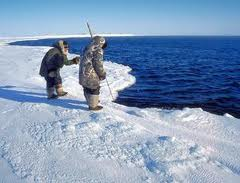
The lifestyle and hunting areas of Inuit in Alaska will be affected due to melting sea ice.

Climate change has devastating effects on Indigenous peoples' psychological wellbeing as it impacts them directly and indirectly. As their lifestyles are often closely linked to the land, climate change directly impacts their physical health and financial stability in quantifiable ways. There is also a concerning correlation between severe mental health issues among Indigenous peoples worldwide and environmental changes. The connection and value Indigenous cultures ascribe to land means that damage to or separation from it, directly impacts mental health. For many, their country is interwoven with psychological aspects such as their identity, community and rituals.

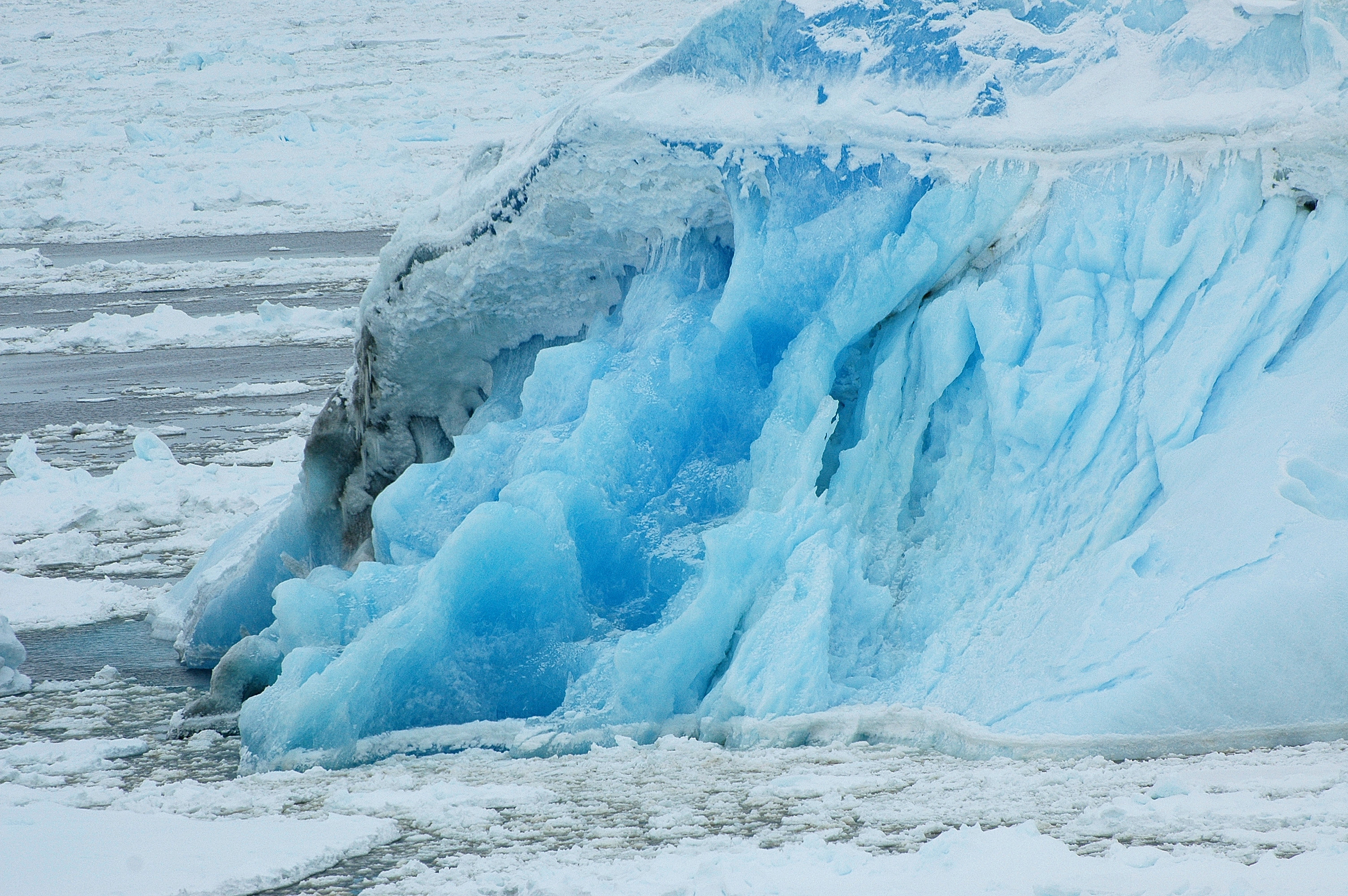
The loss of sea-ice can have psychological impact on people who value it. "We are people of the sea ice. And if there's no more sea ice, how do we be people of the sea ice?" – Inuit elder.

Inadequate government responses which neglect Indigenous knowledge further worsen negative psychological effects linked to climate change. This produces the risk of cultural homogenization due to global adaptation efforts to climate change and the disruption of cultural traditions due to forced relocation. Countries with lower socio-economic status and minority groups in high socio-economic areas are disproportionately affected by the climate crisis. This has created climate migrants due to worsening environmental conditions and catastrophic climate events.

Changes in sea levels and ice formation cause great impacts in Indigenous communities. The changes can lead to shifts in emotions such as anger, fear, anxiety, a sense of loss, etc.; as well as to changes in behavior such as withdrawal, aggression, and increased substance use. A sense of loss due to the changes in traditional weather prediction and navigation techniques has been observed, especially among younger generations where it results in feelings of cultural dislocation and dissociation as well as changes in identity. Climate change is likely to continue affecting Indigenous communities and their mental health for the next decades. Another study indicated that the cumulative effect of repeated exposure to climate change events and related stressors would be likely to lead to some form of mental illness. The effect of climate change on Inuit youth has also been studied, with concern for Elders, reduced connection to the land, challenges to cultural activities, among other things having an effect on mental health on youth.

==== Indigenous peoples of Australia ====
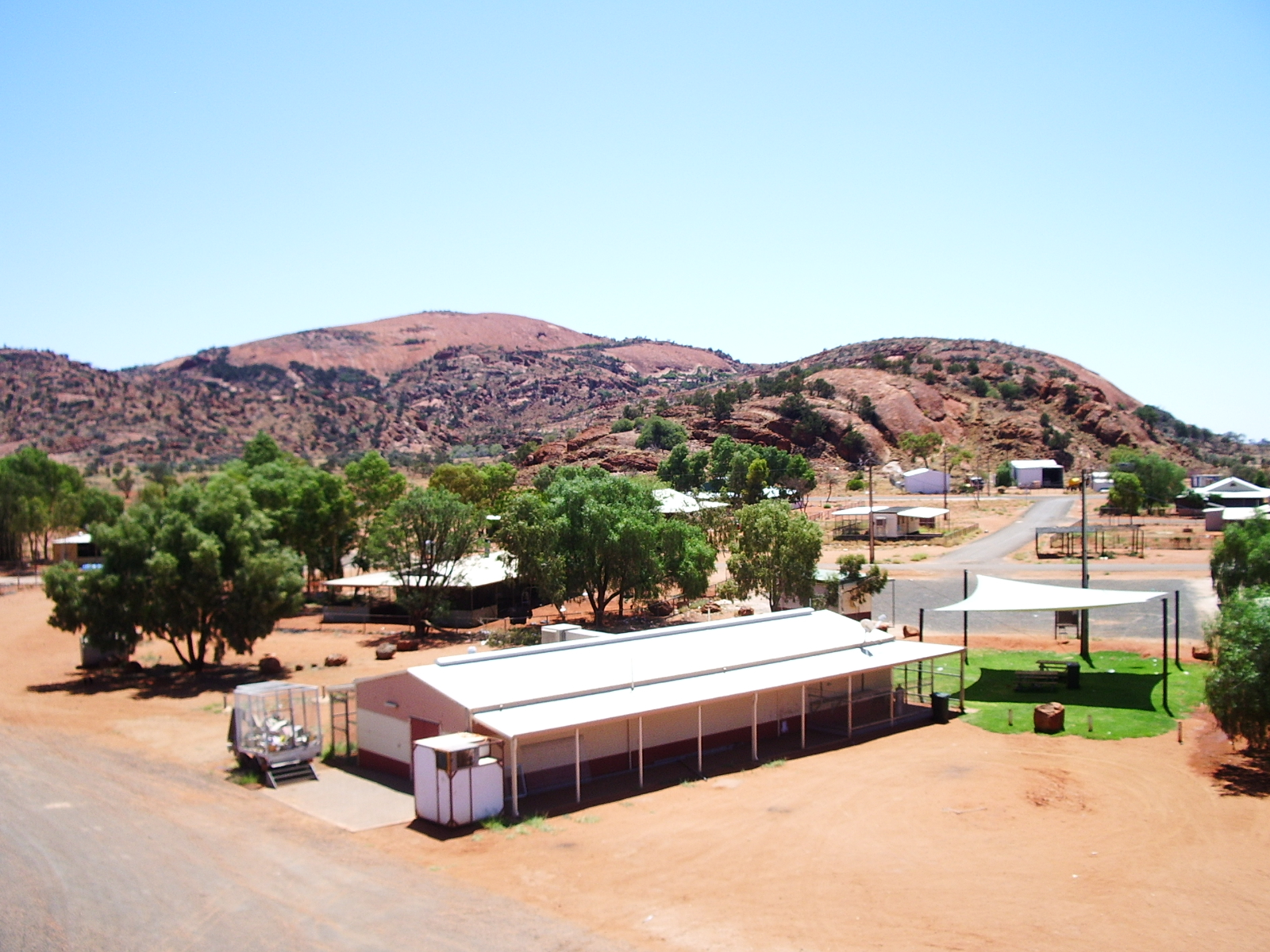
Aboriginal communities might suffer from increased heat waves and drought in some parts of Australia in future (Watarru Anangu Community, South Australia).

Studies conducted with Aboriginal and Torres Strait Islander peoples from Australia also highlight the environmental impacts of climate change on emotional wellbeing, including increased community distress from deteriorating the connection to country. Heat also appeared to be associated with suicide incidence in Australia's Indigenous populations; however, other socio-demographic factors may play a more critical role than meteorological factors.

=== Children ===
Children and young adults are the most vulnerable to climate change impacts. Many of the impacts of climate change that affect children's physical health also lead to psychological and mental health consequences. Children who live in geographic locations that are most susceptible to the impacts of climate change and/or with weaker infrastructure and fewer supports and services suffer the worst impacts. The impacts of climate change on children include them being at a high risk of mental health consequences like PTSD, depression, anxiety, phobias, sleep disorders, attachment disorders, and substance abuse. These conditions can lead to problems with emotion regulation, cognition, learning, behavior, language development, and academic performance.

=== Adolescents ===
Lack of political advocacy and change, with an increase in media attention, has brought upon ecological grief, which has had particular impacts on adolescent mental health. Climate change affects adolescents differently and in a multitude of ways. Many of these ways intersect as each adolescent processes their trauma and distress. Adolescents with pre-existing mental illnesses experience an elevated risk of ecological grief and distress.

While these feelings are not directly harmful to the adolescent's physical health and conditions, they are unpleasant and a rising issue. Ecological grief, distress, anxiety, and anger are the most popular emotions sparked among adolescents. Psychologists, specifically climate psychologists, are experiencing difficulties in originating the source of these emotions, and methods to aid those in need and prevent those not as affected.

Being forced to move, or displacement is becoming more common as the climate crisis rises. Forced displacement may be caused by natural disasters, reduction of food or food security, famine, water scarcity, or other environmental impacts. This displacement alone evokes feelings of grief and loss by being forced to move from a place of comfort to someplace unknown. Reduction of food, famine and water scarcity will indirectly impact an adolescent's health by invoking fear and anxiety, as well as grief and loss.

For adolescents, relationships are important. Displacements can put strains on an adolescent's social relationships, as well as prevent them from further developing their social skills and relationships. Community conflict can also indirectly impact an adolescent's mental health. The community may experience conflicting views on how to approach climate change, climate change methods, and climate change awareness. Surrounded by negative emotions and situations can heavily weigh on a developing adolescent. They may not want to personally experience this conflict with others and pull back from social interactions. They may possess different ideas, but struggle to get someone to listen due to their age. Feelings of hopelessness, helplessness, and fear become prevalent.

== Adaptive impacts ==
While most studies on the psychological impact of climate change finds negative effects, other or adaptive impacts are also possible. Direct experience of the negative effects of climate change may lead to positive personal change. For some individuals, experiencing environmental events such as flooding have resulted in greater psychological salience and concern for climate change, which in turn predicts intentions, behaviors, and support for policy in response to climate change. A potential example of positive impact via the indirect channel would be financial benefits for the minority of farmers who could enjoy increased crop yields. While the overall effects of climate change on agriculture are predicted to be strongly negative, some crops in certain areas are predicted to benefit.

At a personal level, emotions like worry and anxiety are a normal, if uncomfortable, part of life. They can be seen as part of a defense system that identifies and deals with threats. From this perspective, anxiety can help motivate people to seek information and take action on a problem. Anxiety and worry are more likely to be associated with engagement when people feel that they can do things. Feelings of agency can be strengthened by including people in participatory decision-making. Problem-focused and meaning-focused coping skills can also be promoted. Problem-focused coping involves gathering information and finding out what you can do. Meaning-focused coping involves behaviors such as identifying positive information, focusing on constructive sources of hope, and trusting that other people are also doing their part. A sense of agency, coping skills, and social support are all important in building general resilience. Education may benefit from a focus around emotional awareness and the development of sustainable emotion-regulation strategies.

For some individuals, the increased engagement caused by the shared struggle against climate change reduces social isolation and loneliness. At a community level, learning about the science of climate change and taking collective action in response to the threat can increase altruism and social cohesion, strengthen social bonds, and improve resilience. Such positive social impact is generally associated only with communities that had somewhat high social cohesion in the first place, prompting community leaders to act to improve social resiliency before climate-related disruption becomes too severe.

=== Mitigation efforts ===
Psychologists have been assisting the worldwide community in facing the challenge of organizing effective climate change mitigation efforts. Much work has been done on how to best communicate climate-related information to have a positive psychological impact, leading to people engaging in the problem rather than evoking psychological defenses like denial, distance, or a numbing sense of doom. In addition to advising on the method of communication, psychologists have investigated the difference it makes when the right sort of person is communicating. For example, Christiana Figueres and Tom Rivett-Carnac, who led the efforts to organize the 2015 Paris Agreement, have since campaigned to spread the view that a "stubborn optimism" mindset should ideally be part of an individual's psychological response to the climate change challenge.

== Environmental and climate-specific constructs ==
Climate-specific psychological impacts include eco-anxiety, eco-depression, eco-anger, and states of denial or numbness. These can be brought on by too much exposure to alarmist presentations of the climate threat. A study that used confirmatory factor analysis to separate the effects of eco-anxiety, eco-depression, and eco-anger found that eco-anger is the best for the person's wellbeing and also suitable for motivating participation in collective and individual action to mitigate climate change. A 2021 report found that eco-anger was significantly more common among young people.

A 2021 literature review found that emotional responses to crises can be adaptive when the individual has the capacity and support to process and reflect on this emotion. In these cases, individuals can grow from their experiences and support others. In the context of climate change, this capacity for deep reflection is necessary to navigate the emotional challenges that both individuals and societies face.

=== Climate anxiety (eco-anxiety) ===
Eco-anxiety (short for ecological anxiety), also known as eco-distress or climate anxiety, is a challenging emotional response to climate change and other environmental issues. The term ″eco-anxiety″ was invented by Véronique Lepaige, a French researcher in public health, in 1997. Extensive studies have been done on ecological anxiety since 2007, and various definitions remain in use. The condition is not a medical diagnosis and is regarded as a rational response to the reality of climate change; however, severe instances can have a mental health impact if left without alleviation. There is also evidence that eco-anxiety is caused by the way researchers frame their research and their narratives of the evidence about climate change: if they do not consider the possibility of finding any solution to overcome climate change and for individuals to make a difference, they contribute to this feeling of powerlessness.

=== Eco-grief ===
After a Blue Origin spaceflight

It was among the strongest feelings of grief I have ever encountered. The contrast between the vicious coldness of space and the warm nurturing of Earth below filled me with overwhelming sadness. Every day, we are confronted with the knowledge of further destruction of Earth at our hands: the extinction of animal species, of flora and fauna... things that took five billion years to evolve, and suddenly we will never see them again because of the interference of mankind. It filled me with dread. My trip to space was supposed to be a celebration; instead, it felt like a funeral.

— William Shatner in his Boldly Go autobiography

Ecological grief (or eco-grief), or in particular climate grief, refers to the sense of loss that arises from experiencing or learning about environmental destruction or climate change. For example, scientists witnessing the decline of Australia's Great Barrier Reef report experiences of anxiety, hopelessness, and despair. Groups impacted heavily also include young people feeling betrayal from lack of environmental action by governments and indigenous communities losing their livelihoods.

=== Solastalgia ===
Solastalgia (/ˌsɒləˈstældʒə/) is a hypothesized form of emotional or existential distress caused by negatively perceived environmental change. The term is a portmanteau of the Latin words sōlācium (solace or comfort) or solus (desolation) with meanings connected to devastation, deprivation of comfort, abandonment and loneliness, and the Greek root -algia (pain, suffering, grief).

== Co-benefits ==
While most study on the psychological impact of climate change finds negative effects, there may be some positive impacts via direct or indirect pathways.

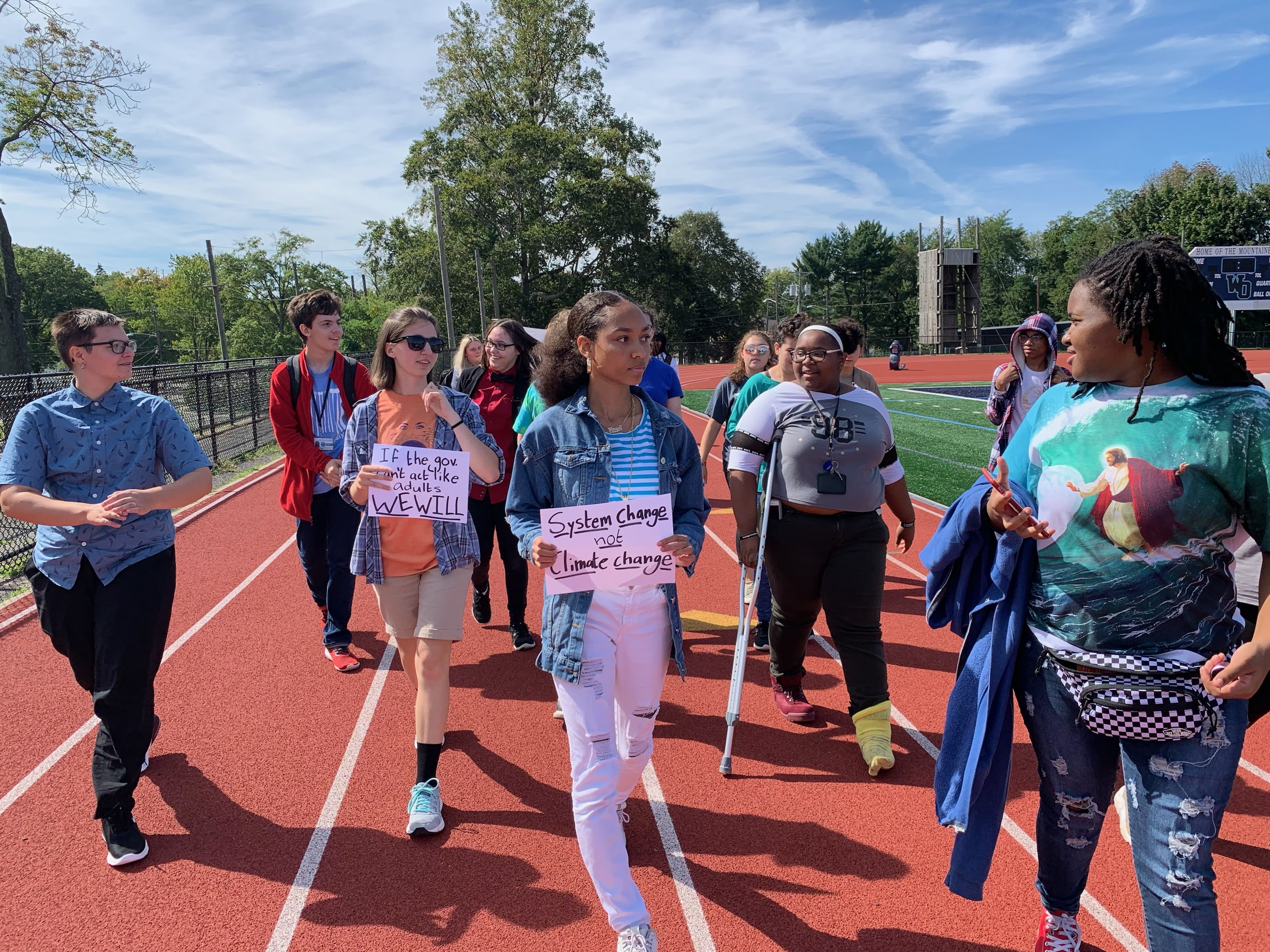
While the psychological impact of climate change is largely negative, related social engagement can have positive effects on mental wellbeing.

=== Climate activism ===
Direct experience of the negative impacts of climate change may also lead to personal changes that can be seen as positive. Direct experiences of environmental events such as flooding have resulted in greater psychological salience and concern for climate change, which in turn predicts intentions, behaviors. and policy support for climate change.

At a personal level, emotions like worry and anxiety are a normal, if uncomfortable, part of life. They can be seen as part of a defense system that identifies threats and deals with them. From this perspective, anxiety can be useful in motivating people to seek information and take action on a problem. Anxiety and worry are more likely to be associated with engagement when people feel that they can do things. Feelings of agency can be strengthened by including people in participatory decision-making. Problem-focused and meaning-focused coping skills can also be promoted. Problem-focused coping involves information gathering and trying to find out what you personally can do. Meaning-focused coping involves behaviors such as identifying positive information, focusing on constructive sources of hope, and trusting that other people are also doing their part. A sense of agency, coping skills, and social support are all important in building general resilience. Education may benefit from a focus around emotional awareness and the development of sustainable emotion-regulation strategies.

For some individuals, the increased engagement caused by the shared struggle against climate change reduces social isolation and loneliness. At a community level, learning about the science of climate change and taking collective action in response to the threat, can increase altruism and social cohesion, strengthen social bonds, and improve resilience. Such positive social impact is generally associated only with communities that had somewhat high social cohesion in the first place, prompting community leaders to act to improve social resiliency before climate-related disruption becomes too severe.

=== Mitigation and adaptation efforts ===
There are potential mental health benefits of mitigation actions taken by individuals, such as active transport, increased physical activity, and healthier diets.

Healthy living has been associated with improved mental health and overall well-being, supported by research on factors such as exercise, nutrition, sleep, stress management, and social connections.

In addition to lifestyle approaches, mental health professionals are addressing the psychological effects of climate change. Psychologists are developing ways to help people cope with climate anxiety, while psychiatrists, social workers, and public health agencies are incorporating climate resilience into care and policy to reduce mental health impacts.

== See also ==
- Barriers to pro-environmental behaviour
- Brain health and pollution
- Climate psychology
- Effects of climate change on human health
- Politics of climate change
- Psychological impact of discrimination on health
- Psychology of climate change denial
