= Solastalgia =

Mental or existential distress caused by environmental change

Solastalgia (/ˌsɒləˈstældʒə/) is a hypothesized form of emotional or existential distress caused by negatively perceived environmental change. The term is a portmanteau of the Latin words sōlācium (solace or comfort) or solus (desolation) with meanings connected to devastation, deprivation of comfort, abandonment and loneliness, and the Greek root -algia (pain, suffering, grief).

A distinction can be made between solastalgia as the lived experience of negatively perceived change in the present, and eco-anxiety linked to worry or concern about what may happen in the future (associated with "pre-traumatic stress", in reference to post-traumatic stress).

== Origins ==
The term solastalgia was coined by philosopher Glenn Albrecht in 2003 and published in the 2005 article 'Solastalgia: a new concept in human health and identity'. He describes it as "the homesickness you have when you are still at home" and your home environment is changing in ways you find distressing. In many cases, this is in reference to global climate change, but more localized events such as volcanic eruptions, drought or destructive mining techniques are claimed to cause solastalgia as well. Differing from nostalgic distress on being absent from home, solastalgia refers to the perceived distress specifically caused by environmental change while still in a home environment.

More recent approaches have attempted to connect solastalgia to the experience of historic heritage threatened by environmental change, such as the ancient cities of Venice, Amsterdam, and Hội An.

== Effects ==
A paper published by Albrecht et al. in 2007 focused on two contexts: the experiences of persistent drought in rural New South Wales (NSW) and the impact of large-scale open-cut coal mining on individuals in the Upper Hunter Valley of NSW. In both cases, an unspecified number of people who were exposed to environmental change were said to have negative reactions brought about by a sense of powerlessness over the unfolding environmental changes. A community's loss of certainty in a once-predictable environment is common among groups that express solastalgia.

In 2015, an article in the medical journal The Lancet included solastalgia as a contributing concept to the impact of climate change on human health and well-being, but does not claim to measure or quantify solastalgia. A study review over solastalgia shows 15 years of scholarly literature on the understanding between climate change, how it is measured in literature, and how it affects people's mentality.

A temporal component of solastalgia has also been highlighted, with scientists demonstrating a link between one's experience of unwelcome environmental change and increased anticipation about changes to come in one's environment, with this being linked with greater reported symptoms of anxiety, PTSD, and anger.

Research has indicated that solastalgia can have an adaptive function when it leads people to seek comfort collectively. Like other climate-related emotions, when processed collectively through conversation that allows for emotion to be processed and reflective function to be increased, this can lead to resilience and growth.

== Contexts ==
=== Employment ===
Hedda Haugen Askland outlines how distress is caused by a lack of interaction between the society in social and political ways, that in turn affect the experience of a community. Societies whose livelihoods are not closely tied to their environment are not as likely to express solastalgia and, in turn, societies that are closely tied to their environments are more susceptible. Groups that depend heavily upon agroecosystems are considered particularly vulnerable. There are many examples of this across Africa, where agrarian communities have lost vital resources due to environmental changes. This has resulted in an increase in the number of environmental refugees throughout Africa in recent years.

=== Wealth ===
Solastalgia is argued to generally affect wealthier populations less. A study conducted in the Western United States showed higher-income families experienced the effects of solastalgia significantly less than their lower-income neighbors following a destructive wildfire. This is argued to be due to the flexibility that wealth can provide. In this case, wealthy families were able to move from or rebuild their homes, reducing uncertainty caused by the wildfire. Other studies have supported the existence of solastalgia in Appalachian communities affected by mountaintop removal coal mining practices. Communities located in close proximity to coal mining sites experienced significantly higher depression rates than those located farther from the sites.

== See also ==
- Ecophobia
- Ecopsychology
- Environmental psychology
- Paradise, California
