= Ecophobia =

Feeling of powerlessness to prevent cataclysmic environmental change

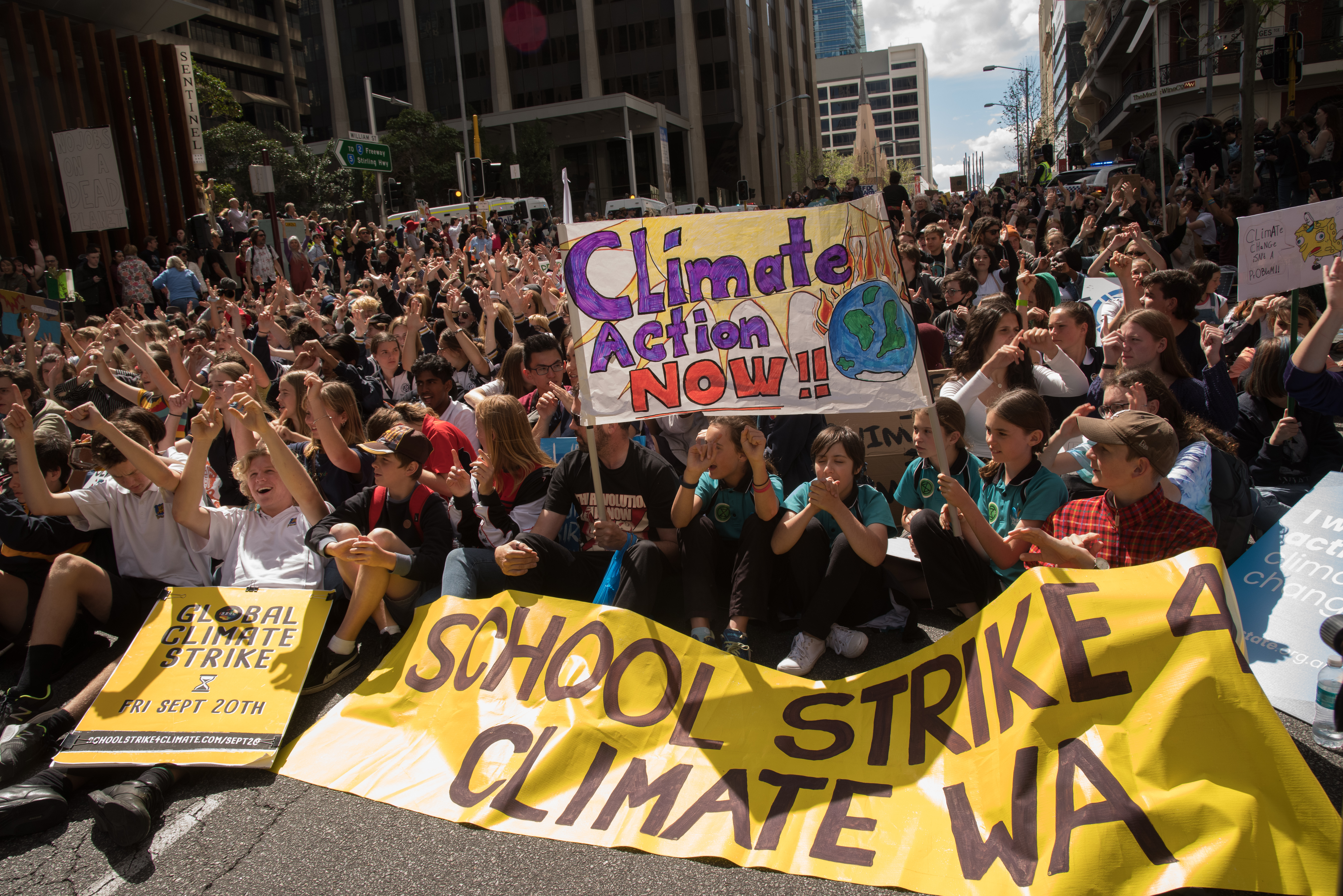

Ecophobia is the fear of, or an ethical undervaluing of the natural environment that can result in, cataclysmic environmental change. The term was coined, as author Simon C. Estok has revealed in his book The Ecophobia Hypothesis, by George F. Will in a September 18, 1988 Chicago Sun-Times article entitled "The Politics of Ecophobia." Will, cited by Estok, defines it as "the fear that the planet is increasingly inhospitable."

== Overview ==
To date, Estok has done the most work defining and expanding the concept of ecophobia. He explains that "The ecophobic condition exists on a spectrum and can embody fear, contempt, indifference, or lack of mindfulness (or some combination of these) toward the natural environment. While its genetic origins have functioned, in part, to preserve our species (for instance, the fight or flight response), the ecophobic condition has also greatly serviced growth economies and ideological interests. Often a product of behaviours serviceable in the past but destructive in the present, it is also sometimes a product of the perceived requirements of our seemingly exponential growth. . . . Ecophobia exists globally on both macro and micro levels, and its manifestation is at times directly apparent and obvious but is also often deeply obscured by the clutter of habit and ignorance".

Environmental educator David Sobel uses the term somewhat differently, describing instead the fear of the environmental effects of human actions – ranging anywhere from oil spills to deforestation. Sobel described it as "a helpless sense of dread about the future." A study with 10-to-12-year-olds found 82% of the children expressed fear, sadness, and anger about environmental problems.

The neologism was used by Simon C. Estok, David Sobel, and Roger Scruton.

== Ecophobia and COVID-19 ==
The University of Cambridge tells it readers that the COVID-19 pandemic has brought to life and exacerbated many conditions and differences between people. Estok draws direct links between ecophobia and COVID-19, explaining, among other things, that "Pandemics are always environmental events, the current one being a direct result of closer human/nonhuman animal contacts—itself a result of diminishing food sources and increasing populations. Given these facts, and given the fact that ecophobia is central to the environmental crises we have created, theoretical, personal, and political discussions about ecophobia and COVID-19 are very timely."

== Ecophobia and theater ==
Turkish folk theater dramatizes ecophobia by showing fear, anxiety, and threat of the natural world, with traditional plays often showing dominance of the natural world.

Many eco-critics and academic writers have noticed Shakespeare's representations of ecophobia in nature in plays like Othello and King Lear, among others: "The play markets this dramatic ecophobia to an audience very familiar with grain shortages, bad harvests, cold weather, and profound storms. It was a time of unprecedented exploration, perhaps in part owing to the poor harvests and lack of local fish, and the world was getting smaller." Critics also point out the ecophobia induced by monsters in Shakespeare's plays: "The plays' obsession with monsters jiggles orders, hierarchies, values, rules, and forms defining nature."

== Ecophobia and The Green New Deal ==
The Green New Deal is a broad topic scope that defines a group of policies that aim to address the problems the planet faces, with the most recent example being legislation introduced in the United States House of Representatives by Representative Alexandria Ocasio-Cortez. The phenomenon surrounding ecophobia has actually made it more difficult to pass legislation such as this, because voters allow their fear to impact how they vote. This in turn leads to a lack of legislation that addresses climate change policy.

Political statements made by President Donald Trump have been cited as an example of sociopolitical effects of ecophobia, and especially how it can impact opinions on climate change. Critics have argued that rhetoric inspired by ecophobia can limit open discussion about climate change policy and Green New Deal legislation.

== See also ==
- Learned helplessness
- Climate crisis
- Ecocide
- Ecocriticism
