= Glenn Albrecht =

Australian academic

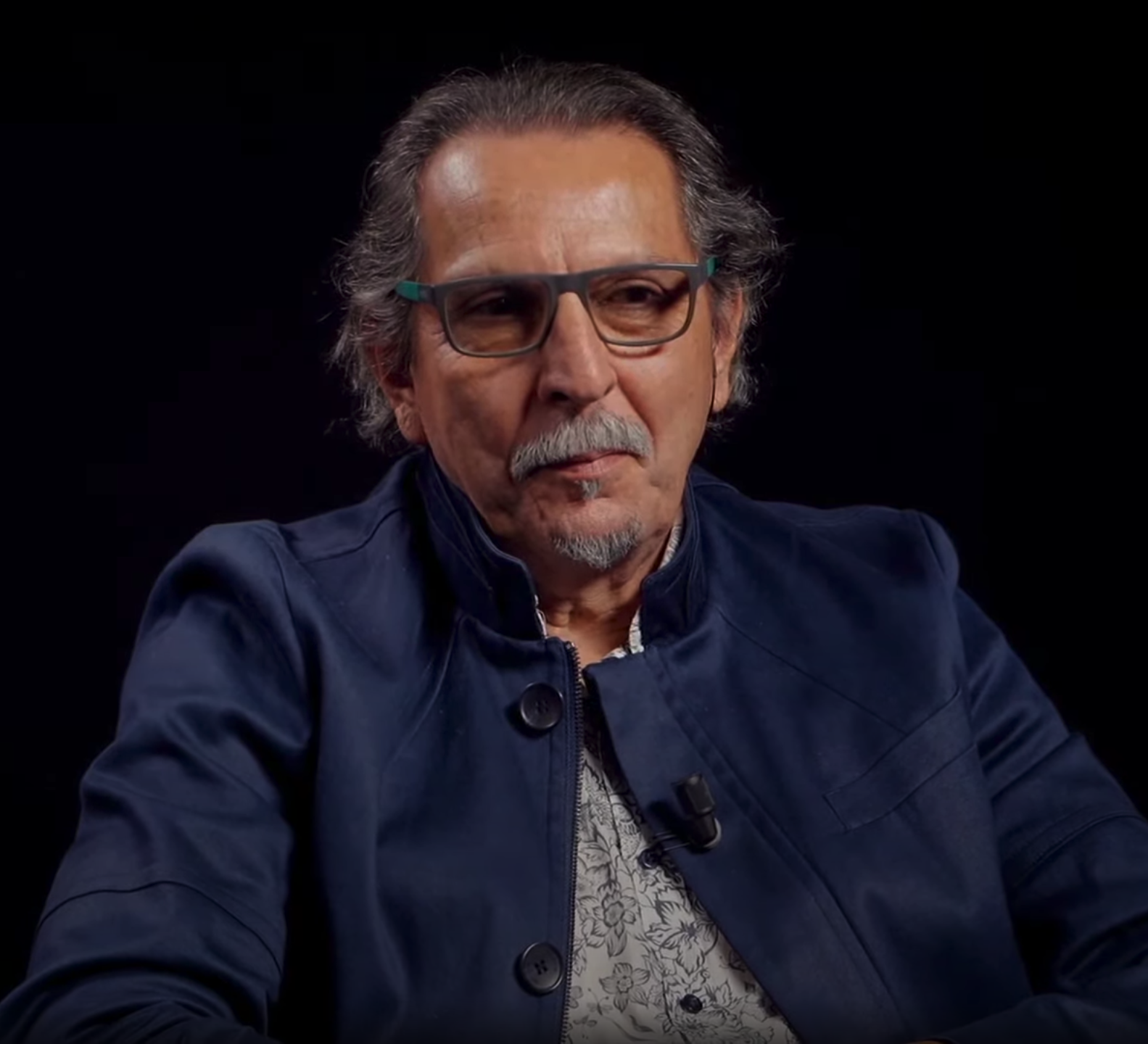
Interview with Glenn Albrecht on the francophone YouTube channel Thinkerview

Glenn A. Albrecht, born in 1953, was Professor of Sustainability at Murdoch University in Western Australia until his retirement in 2014. He is an honorary fellow in the School of Geosciences of the University of Sydney.

In 2008, Albrecht finished as the Associate Professor in Environmental Studies in University of Newcastle in New South Wales. He has become known for coining the neologism solastalgia and symbiocene.

== Biography ==
Glenn Albrecht is an environmental philosopher with both theoretical and applied interests in the relationship between ecosystem and human health. He has pioneered the research domain of 'psychoterratic' or earth related mental health conditions with the concept of 'solastalgia' or the lived experience of negative environmental change. He also has publications in the field of animal ethics including the ethics of relocating endangered species in the face of climate change pressures.

Glenn Albrecht's most recent publication is 'Earth Emotions: New Words for a New World', published in May 2019.

He has been published in many peer reviewed journals and has recently completed and published book chapters on his research interests. With colleagues, Nick Higginbotham (University of Newcastle) and Linda Connor (Sydney University) under Australian Research Council Discovery Project grants, Glenn has researched the impact of mining in the Upper Hunter Region of NSW, Australia, and now, the impact of climate change on communities, again in the Hunter Region. Glenn has also been involved as a Chief Investigator in ARC Discovery Project research on the social and ethical aspects of the thoroughbred horse industry worldwide.

Glenn Albrecht is a pioneer of transdisciplinary thinking and, with Higginbotham and Connor produced a major book on this topic, Health Social Science: A Transdisciplinary and Complexity Perspective with Oxford University Press in 2001. His current major research interest, the positive and negative psychological, emotional and cultural relationships people have to place and its transformation is one that sees him having an international research profile.

== Bibliography ==
- Albrecht, Glenn (2005). "Solastalgia: A New Concept in Human Health and Identity", Philosophy, Activism, Nature 3, pp. 41–55.
- Albrecht, Glenn (2005). "Constructing our Future", Journal of the Asia Pacific Centre for Environmental Accountability 11(2), pp. 8–9.
- Sartore, G.; Stain, H.; Kelly, B.; Higginbotham, Nick; Albrecht, Glenn; Toona, A. (2005). "Health in a Rural New South Wales Community", Australian and New Zealand Journal of Psychiatry 39.
- Albrecht, Glenn (2005). "Organicism and the Organic University", Concrescence: The Australasian Journal of Process Thought 6, pp. 43–60.
- Albrecht, Glenn (2006). "Environmental Distress as Solastalgia", Alternatives 32 (4/5), pp. 34–35.
- Albrecht, Glenn (2006). "The Ethics of Climate Chaos", Journal of the Asia Pacific Centre for Environmental Accountability 12 (2), pp. 19–21.
- Higginbotham, Nick; Connor, Linda; Albrecht, Glenn; Freeman, S.; Agho, K. (2006). "Validation of an Environmental Distress Scale (EDS)", EcoHealth 3 (4), pp. 245–254.
- Albrecht, Glenn; Sartore, G.; et al. (2007). "Solastalgia: The distress caused by environmental change", Australasian Psychiatry 15, pp. 95–98.
- Albrecht, Glenn; Higginbotham, Nick; Connor, Linda; Freeman, S. (2008). "Social and Cultural Perspectives on Eco-Health", in International Encyclopedia of Public Health, K. Heggenhougen and S. Quah (eds). San Diego: Academic Press, pp. 57–63.
- Albrecht, Glenn (2008). "Solastalgia", in Ice: A Passage Through Time, Gage, H. (ed). Alaska: Ampersand Press.
- Sartore G. M.; Kelly B.; Stain H.; Albrecht Glenn; Higginbotham, Nick (2008). "Control, Uncertainty, and expectations for the future: A qualitative study of the impact of drought on a rural Australian community", Rural and Remote Health 8, pp. 1–14.
- Connor, Linda; Higginbotham, Nick; Freeman, S.; Albrecht, Glenn (2008). "Watercourses and Discourses: Coalmining in the Upper Hunter Valley, New South Wales", Oceania 78 (1), pp. 76–90.
- Albrecht, Glenn; McMahon, C.; Bowman, D.; Bradshaw, C. (2009). "Convergence of culture, ecology and ethics: management of feral swamp buffalo in northern Australia", Journal of Agricultural and Environmental Ethics 22: 61–378.
- Albrecht, Glenn (2010). Resilience and Water Security in Two Outback Cities. Gold Coast, Queensland: National Climate Change Adaptation Research Facility. ISBN 978-1-92160917-6.
- Albrecht, Glenn (2010). "Solastalgia and the Creation of New Ways of Living", in Nature and Culture: Rebuilding Lost Connections, Pretty, J. and Pilgrim S. (eds). London: Earthscan, pp. 217–234.
- Higginbotham, Nick; Freeman, S.; Connor, Linda; Albrecht, Glenn (2010). "Environmental Injustice and air pollution in coal affected communities, Hunter Valley, Australia", Health and Place 16, pp. 259–266.
- Albrecht, Glenn (2011). "Chronic Environmental Change and Mental Health", in Climate Change and Human Well-Being: Global Challenges and Opportunities, Weissbecker, I. (ed). Berlin: Springer SBM, pp. 43–56.
- McManus, P.; Albrecht, Glenn; Graham, R. (2011). "Constructing Thoroughbred Breeding Landscapes: Manufactured Idylls in the Upper Hunter Region of Australia", in Engineering Earth: The Impacts of Mega-engineering Projects, Brunn S. D. (ed). New York: Springer Dordrecht, pp. 1323–1339.
- Phelan, L.; Taplin, R.; Henderson Sellers, A.; Albrecht, Glenn (2011). "Ecological Viability or Liability? Insurance System Responses to Climate Risk, Environmental Policy and Governance", Environmental Policy and Governance.
- Albrecht, Glenn (2012). "Psychoterratic Conditions in a Scientific and Technological World", in Ecopsychology: Science, Totems, and the Technological Species, Kahn, P., Hasbach, P. (eds). Cambridge: MIT Press, pp. 241–264.
- Albrecht, Glenn; Graham, R.; McManus, P. (2012). The Global Horseracing Industry: Social, Economic, Environmental, and Ethical Perspectives. London: Routledge. ISBN 978-0-20313243-2.
- Albrecht, Glenn; Brooke, C.; Bennett, D.; Garnett, S. T. (2012). "The Ethics of Assisted Colonization in the Age of Anthropogenic Climate Change", The Journal of Agricultural and Environmental Ethics.
- Montoya, D.; McManus, P.; Albrecht, Glenn (2012). "Jumping to Conclusions? Media Coverage of Jumps Racing Debates in Australia", Society & Animals 20.
- Albrecht, Glenn (2013). "Solastalgie: Heimweh in der Heimat", in Natur im Blick der Kulturen, Jung, N., Molitor, H., Schilling, A. (eds.). Leverkusen: Budrich Uni-Press, pp. 47–60.
- Albrecht, Glenn (2013). "El Dano Al Medio Ambiente Se Mete En Tu Cabenza", Etiqueta Verde 2 (9), p. 100.
- Albrecht, Glenn; Ellis, N. (2014). "The Ethics of Resource Extraction and Processing: Two Western Australian Case Studies", in Resource Curse or Cure? On the Sustainability of Development in Western Australia. Heidelberg, Brueckner, M.; Durey, A.; Mayes.; Pforr, C. (eds). Heidelberg: Springer, pp. 43–58. ISBN 978-3-64253873-5.
- Albrecht Glenn (2014). "Ecopsychology in 'The Symbiocene'", Ecopsychology 6 (1), pp. 58–59.
- Albrecht, Glenn; Higginbotham, Nick; Connor, Linda; Ellis, N. (2016). "Social and Cultural Perspectives on Ecology and Health", in The International Encyclopedia of Public Health. Chatswood: Elsevier. ISBN 978-0-12803678-5.
- Albrecht, Glenn (2016). "Exiting The Anthropocene and Entering The Symbiocene", Minding Nature 9 (2).
- Albrecht, Glenn (2017). "Solastalgia and the New Mourning", in Mourning Nature: Hope at the Heart of Ecological Loss & Grief, Willox, A. C.; Landman, K. (eds). Kingston: McGill-Queen's University Press. ISBN 978-0-77354935-7.
- Albrecht, Glenn A. (2019). "Earth Emotions: New Words for a New World". Cornell University Press. ISBN 978-1-50171522-8.
- Albrecht, Glenn A. (2020). "Les émotions de la Terre – Des nouveau mots pour un nouveau monde". Les Liens Qui Libèrent.
