= Psychology of climate change denial =

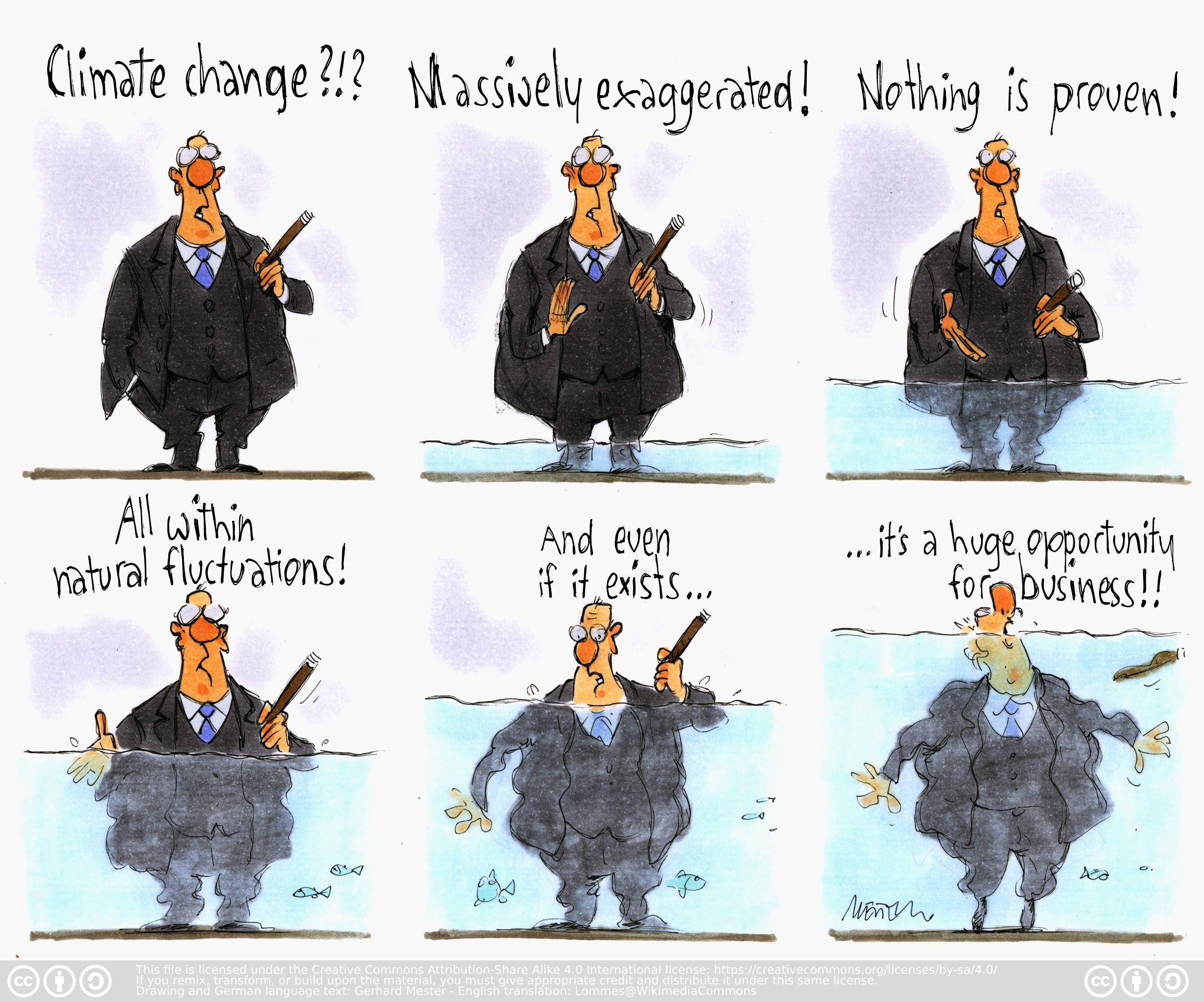
A cartoon to describe the different stages and behaviours of climate change denial from "what is climate change?" to "nothing is proven!" to "even if it exists...it's a huge opportunity for business!"

The psychology of climate change denial is the study of why people deny climate change, despite the scientific consensus on climate change. A study assessed public perception and action on climate change on grounds of belief systems, and identified seven psychological barriers affecting behavior that otherwise would facilitate mitigation, adaptation, and environmental stewardship: cognition, ideological worldviews, comparisons to key people, costs and momentum, disbelief in experts and authorities, perceived risks of change, and inadequate behavioral changes. Other factors include distance in time, space, and influence.

Reactions to climate change may include anxiety, depression, despair, dissonance, uncertainty, insecurity, and distress, with one psychologist suggesting that "despair about our changing climate may get in the way of fixing it." The American Psychological Association has urged psychologists and other social scientists to work on psychological barriers to taking action on climate change. The immediacy of a growing number of extreme weather events are thought to motivate people to deal with climate change.

== Types of denial ==
=== Expanding the meaning of "Denial" ===
The idea of "soft" or implicit climate change denial became prominent in the mid-2010s, but variations of the same concept originated earlier. An article published by National Center for Science Education referred to "implicit" denial:

Climate change denial is most conspicuous when it is explicit, as it is in controversies over climate education. The idea of implicit (or "implicatory") denial, however, is increasingly discussed among those who study the controversies over climate change. Implicit denial occurs when people who accept the scientific community's consensus on the answers to the central questions of climate change on the intellectual level fail to come to terms with it or to translate their acceptance into action. Such people are in denial, so to speak, about climate change.

In May 2015, environmentalist Bill McKibben penned an op-ed criticizing Barack Obama's policies of approving petroleum exploration in the Arctic, expanding coal mining, and remaining indecisive on the Keystone XL pipeline. McKibben wrote:

This is not climate denial of the Republican sort, where people simply pretend the science isn't real. This is climate denial of the status quo sort, where people accept the science, and indeed make long speeches about the immorality of passing on a ruined world to our children. They just deny the meaning of the science, which is that we must keep carbon in the ground.

McKibben's use of the word "denial" was an early expansion of the term's meaning in environmental discourse to include "denial of the significance or logical consequences of a fact or problem; in this case, what advocates see as the necessary policies that flow from the dangers of global warming."

=== Analysis of soft climate change denial ===
Michael Hoexter, a scholar and sustainability advocate, analyzed the phenomenon of "soft climate change denial" in a September 2016 article for the blog New Economic Perspectives and expanded on the idea in a follow-up article published the next month. Despite the term's earlier, informal usage, Hoexter has been credited with formally defining the concept. In Hoexter's terms, "soft" climate denial "means that one acknowledges in some parts of one's life that climate change is real, disastrous and happening now but in most other parts of one's life, one ignores that anthropogenic global warming is, in fact, a real existential emergency and catastrophic." According to Hoexter, "soft climate denial and the thin gruel of climate action policies that accompany it may be functioning as a 'face-saving' device to mask fundamental inertia or a deep manifest preference for inaction while continuing fossil-fueled business as usual."

He also applied the term to "more 'radical' groups" that pushed for more responsive measures, but "often either miss the mark in terms of the climate challenge facing us or wrap themselves in communication strategies and 'memes' that limit their potential influence on politics and policy." In Hoexter's view, soft denial can only be escaped through collective action, not individual action or realization.

Soft climate change denial (also called implicit or implicatory climate change denial) is a state of mind acknowledging the existence of global warming in the abstract while remaining, to some extent, in partial psychological or intellectual denialism about its reality or impact. It is contrasted with conventional "hard" climate change denial, which refers to explicit disavowal of the consensus on global warming's existence, causes, or effects (including its effects on human society).

== Psychological reasons for denial ==
Various psychological factors can impact the effectiveness of communication about climate change, driving potential climate change denial. Psychological barriers, such as emotions, opinions and morals refer to the internal beliefs that a person has which stop them from completing a certain action. Psychologists Alessandra S. Souza, João Vieira, and São Luís Castro, noted and proposed 5 key reasons for climate change denial. According to the authors, "Psychological barriers such as (1) finding change unnecessary; (2) conflicting goals; (3) interpersonal relationships; (4) lack of knowledge; and (5) tokenism have been proposed as an explanation for the gap between environmental attitudes and actions."

A study published in PLOS One in 2024 found that even a single repetition of a claim was sufficient to increase the perceived truth of both climate science-aligned claims and climate change skeptic/denial claims—"highlighting the insidious effect of repetition". This effect was found even among climate science endorsers.

Polarization in the climate change debate, with skeptics labeling proponents 'catastrophists' and proponents calling skeptics 'deniers,' reflects psychological barriers like in-group/out-group bias and confirmation bias, which entrench denial by reinforcing group identities. Skeptics often exhibit confirmation bias by distrusting climate science, while proponents may show overconfidence in social science predictions, both hindering balanced understanding of climate change. A further cognitive barrier is the assumption that climate change impacts society in a linear, negative way, oversimplifying the complex, pluralistic nature of societal responses and contributing to denialist narratives. For example, the 1970 Ancash Earthquake in Peru, which killed 70,000 due to societal factors like maladaptive building practices, illustrates a cognitive bias where denialists misattribute climate risks to natural causes, ignoring societal influences.

=== Distance in time, space, and influence ===
Climate change is often portrayed as occurring in the future, whether that be the near or distant future. Many estimations portray climate change effects as occurring by 2050 or 2100, which both seem much more distant in time than they really are, which can create a barrier to acceptance. There is also a barrier created by the distance portrayed in climate change discussions. Effects caused by climate change across the planet do not seem concrete to people living thousands of miles away, especially if they are not experiencing any effects. Climate change is also a complex, abstract concept to many, which can create barriers to understanding. Carbon dioxide is an invisible gas, and it causes changes in overall average global temperatures, both of which are difficult, if not impossible, for one single person to discern. Due to these distances in time, space, and influence, climate change becomes a far-away, abstract issue that does not demand immediate attention.

Anthony Leiserowitz, the director of the Yale Program on Climate Change Communication said that one "almost couldn't design a worse fit for our underlying psychology or our institutions of decision-making" than dealing with climate change—owing primarily to the short-term focus of humans and their institutions.

=== Cognitive dissonance ===
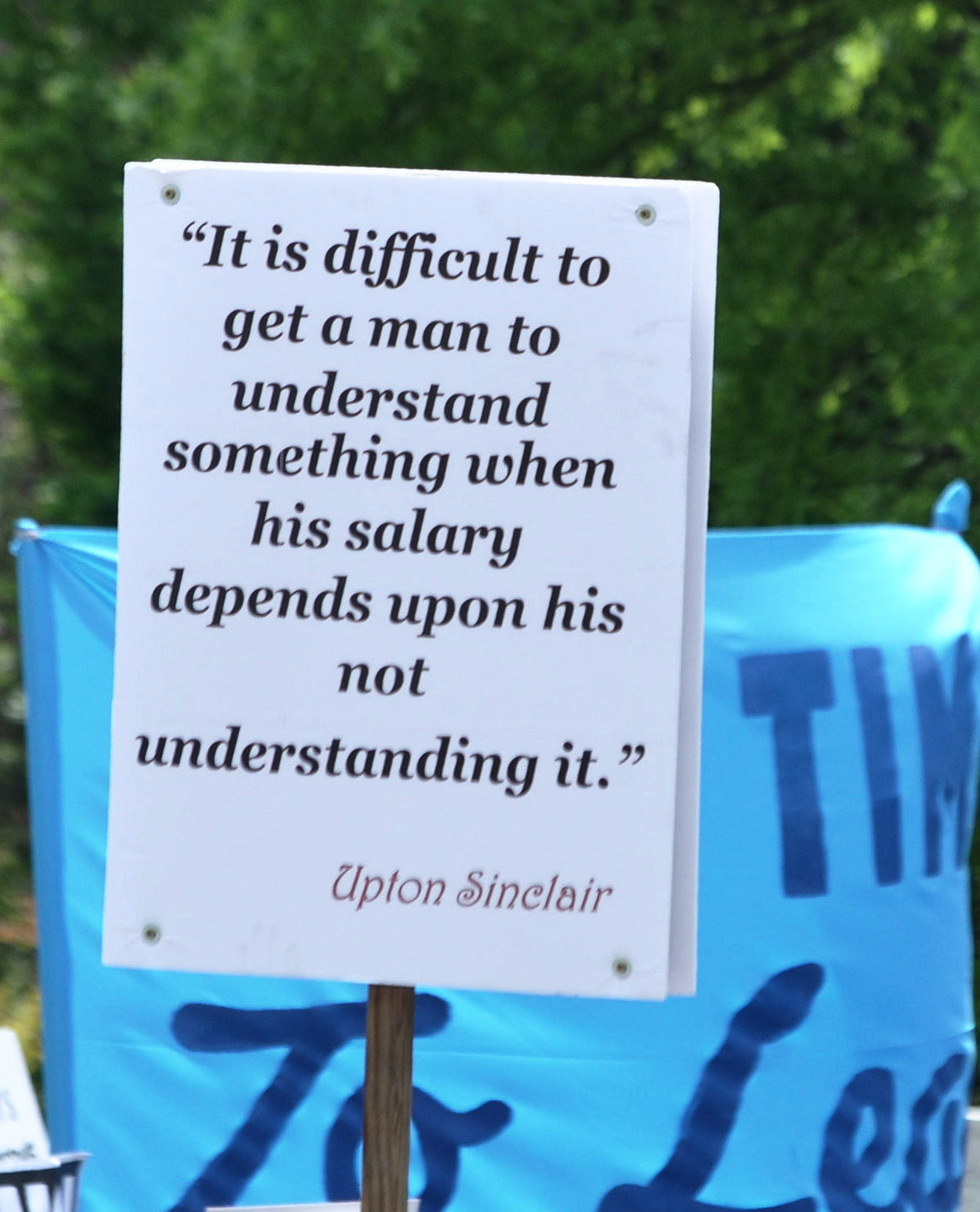
Sign at Climate March (2017)

Cognitive dissonance refers to the psychological discomfort arising from holding conflicting beliefs or engaging in actions inconsistent with one’s values. In the context of climate change, individuals often experience dissonance when their acknowledgment of the climate crisis conflicts with their everyday behaviors or perceived self-interest. Because there is little solid action that people can take on a daily basis to combat climate change, then some believe climate change must not be as pressing an issue as it is made out to be. An example of this phenomenon is that most people know smoking cigarettes is not healthy, yet people continue to smoke cigarettes, and so an inner discomfort is elicited by the contradiction in ‘thinking’ and ‘doing’. A similar cognitive dissonance is created when people know that things like driving, flying, and eating meat are causing climate change, but the infrastructure is not in place to change those behaviors effectively.

In order to address this dissonance, climate change is rejected or downplayed. This dissonance also fuels denial, wherein people cannot find a solution to an anxiety-inducing problem, and so the problem is denied outright. Creating stories that climate change is actually caused by something out of humans’ control, such as sunspots or natural weather patterns, or suggesting that we must wait until we are certain of all of the facts about climate change before any action be taken, are manifestations of this fear and consequent denial of climate change.

"It seems as if people stop paying attention to global climate change when they realise that there are no easy solutions for it. Many people instead judge as serious only those problems for which they think action can be found."

Individuals are alarmed about the dangerous potential futures resulting from a high-energy world in which climate change was occurring, but simultaneously create denial mechanisms to overcome the dissonance of knowing these futures, yet not wanting to change their convenient lifestyles. These denial mechanisms include things like overestimating the costs of changing their lifestyles, blaming others, including government or corporations, rather than their own inaction, and emphasizing the doubt that individual action could make a difference within a problem so large.

=== Cognitive Barriers ===
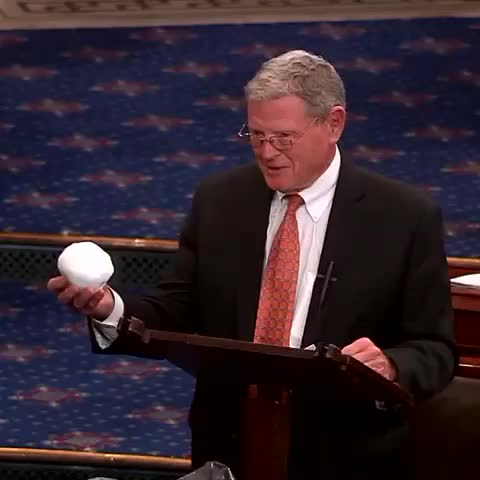
On the floor of the U.S. Senate, Republican Senator Jim Inhofe displayed a snowball—in winter—as evidence the globe was not warming—in a year that was found to be Earth's warmest on record. The director of NASA's Goddard Institute for Space Studies distinguished local weather in a single location in a single week from long-term global climate change.

Cognitive barriers to climate change acceptance include:

- Limited cognition of the human brain, caused by things like the fact that the human brain has not evolved much in thousands of years, and so has not transitioned to caring about the future rather than immediate danger,
- ignorance, the idea that environments are composed of more elements than humans can monitor, so we only attend to things causing immediate difficulty, which climate change does not seem to do
- uncertainty, undervaluing of distant or future risk, optimism bias,
- the belief that an individual can do nothing against climate change are all cognitive barriers to climate change acceptance.

=== Conspiratorial beliefs ===
Climate change denial is commonly rooted in a phenomenon commonly known as conspiracy theory, in which people misattribute events to a secret plot or plan by a powerful group of individuals. The development of conspiracy theories is further prompted by the proportionality bias that results from climate change — an event of mass scale and a great deal of significance — being frequently presented as a result of daily small-scale human behavior; often, individuals are less likely to believe large events of this scale can be so easily explained by ordinary details.

This inclination is furthered by a variety of possible strong individually and socially grounded reasons to believe in these conspiracy theories. The social nature of being a human holds influential merit when it comes to information evaluation. Conspiracy theories reaffirm the idea that people are part of moral social groups that have the ability to remain firm in the face of deep-seated threats. Conspiracy theories also feed into the human desire and motivation to maintain one's level of self-esteem, a concept known as self-enhancement. With climate change in particular, one possibility for the popularity of climate change conspiracy theories is that these theories knee-cap the reasoning that humans are culpable for the degradation of their own world and environment. This allows for maintenance of one's own self-esteem, and provides strong backing for belief in conspiracy theories. These climate change conspiracy theories pass the social blame to others, which upholds both the self and the in-group as moral and legitimate, making them highly appealing to those who perceive a threat to the esteem of themselves or their group. In a similar vein, much like how conspiracy belief is linked with narcissism, it is also predicted by collective narcissism. Collective narcissism is a belief in the distinction of one's own group whilst believing that those outside the group do not give the group enough recognition.

A variety of factors related to the nature of climate change science itself also enable the proliferation of conspiratorial beliefs. Climate change is a complicated field of science for lay people to make sense of. Research has experimentally indicated that people are used to creating patterns where there are none when they perceive a loss of control in order to return the world to one they can make sense of. Research indicates that people hold stronger beliefs about conspiracies when they exhibit distress as a consequence of uncertainty, which are both prominent when it comes to climate change science. Additionally, in order to meet the psychological desire for clear, cognitive closure, the likes of which is not consistently accessible to lay people regarding climate change, people often lean on conspiracy theories. Bearing this in mind, it is also crucial to note that conspiracy belief is conversely lessened in intensity when individuals have their sense of control affirmed.

People with certain cognitive tendencies are also more drawn to conspiracy theories about climate change as compared to others. Aside from narcissism as previously mentioned, conspiratorial beliefs are more predominantly found in those who consistently look for meanings or patterns in their world, which often includes those who believe in paranormal activities. Climate change conspiracy disbelief is also linked with lower levels of education and analytic thinking. If a person has a predisposed inclination towards perceiving others’ actions as having been actively done willfully even when no such thing is happening, they are more likely to buy into conspiratorial thinking.

The global COVID-19 pandemic has contributed to the increase of conspiratorial beliefs, contested science, skepticism, and overall denial of climate science. Researchers studying science skepticism of vaccination for COVID-19 see direct linkages between this and science skepticism for other large-scale domain issues like that of climate science.

=== Threat to self-interest ===
The realisation that an individual's actions contribute to climate change can threaten their self-interest and compromise their psychological integrity. The threat to self-interest can often result in ‘denialism’ – a refusal to accept and even deny the scientific evidence- manifested across all levels of society. Large organisations that have a strong vested interest in activities directly responsible for climate change, such as fossil fuel companies, may even promote climate change denial through the spread of misinformation.

Denial is manifested at the individual level where it is used to protect the self from overwhelming emotional responses to climate change. This is often referred to as ‘soft denial’ or ‘disavowal’ in the relevant literature. Here the dangers of climate change are experienced in a purely intellectual way, resulting in no psychological disturbance: cognition is split off from feeling. Disavowal can be induced by a wide variety of psychological processes including: the diffusion of responsibility, rationalisation, perceptual distortion, wishful thinking and projection. These are all avoidant ways of coping.

=== Framing ===
In popular climate discourse framing, the three dominant framing ideas have been apocalypse, uncertainty and high costs/losses. These framings create intense feelings of fear and doom and helplessness. Framing climate change in these ways creates thoughts that nothing can be done to change the trajectory, that any solution will be too expensive and do too little, or that it is not worth trying to find a solution to something we are unsure is happening. Climate change has been framed this way for years, and so these messages are instilled in peoples’ minds, elicited whenever the words "climate change" are brought up.

=== Ideology and religion ===
Belief that human activity is the primary cause of climate change varies widely by religious affiliation, with less than one-third of white evangelical Protestants holding that belief.

Ideologies, including suprahuman powers, technosalvation, and system justification, are all psychological barriers to climate change acceptance. Suprahuman powers describes the belief that humans cannot or should not interfere because they believe a religious deity will not turn on them or will do what it wants to do regardless of their intervention. Technosalvation is the ideology that technologies such as geoengineering will save us from climate change, and so mitigation behavior is not necessary. Another ideological barrier is the ideology of system justification, or the defense and justification of the status quo, so as to not "rock the boat" on a comfortable lifestyle.

Research found that 80–90% of Americans underestimate the prevalence of support for major climate change mitigation policies and climate concern among fellow Americans. While 66–80% Americans support these policies, Americans estimate the prevalence to be 37–43%—barely half as much. Researchers have called this misperception a false social reality, a form of pluralistic ignorance.

=== Own behaviors, habits, aspirations ===
People are also very invested in their own behavior. Behavioral momentum, or daily habits, are one of the most important barriers to remove for climate change mitigation. Lastly, conflicting values, goals, and aspirations can interfere with the acceptance of climate change mitigation. Because many of the goals held by individuals directly conflict with climate change mitigation strategies, climate change gets pushed to the bottom of their list of values, so as to minimize the extent of its conflict.

One type of limited behavior is tokenism, where after completing one small task or engaging in one small behavior, the individual feels they have done their part to mitigate climate change, when in reality they could be doing much more. Individuals could also experience the rebound effect, where one positive activity is diminished or erased by a subsequent activity (like walking to work all week because you are flying across the country every weekend).

Financial investment in fossil fuels and other climate change inducing industries (sunk costs) is often a reason for denial of climate change. If one accepts that these things cause climate change, they would have to lose their investment, and so continued denial is more acceptable.

The difficulty of comprehending the sheer scale of global warming and its effects can result in sincere (albeit ill-founded) belief that individual changes in behavior will suffice to address the problem without requiring more fundamental structural changes.

=== Views of others and perceived risk ===
If someone is held in a negative light, it is not likely others will take guidance from them due to feelings of mistrust, inadequacy, denial of their beliefs, and reactance against statements they believe threaten their freedom.

Several types of perceived risk can occur when an individual is considering changing their behavior to accept and mitigate climate change: functional risk, physical risk, financial risk, social risk, psychological risk, and temporal risk. Due to the perception of all of these risks, the individual may just reject climate change altogether to avoid potential risks completely.

Social comparisons between individuals build social norms. These social norms then dictate how someone "should" behave in order to align with society's ideas of "proper" behavior. This barrier also includes perceived inequity, where an individual feels they should not or do not have to act a certain way because they believe no one else acts that way.

== Psychological reasons for soft denial ==
There are several beliefs or thought patterns that tend to contribute to soft climate denial:

1. Psychological isolation and compartmentalization – Events of everyday life usually lack an obvious connection to global warming. As such, people compartmentalize their awareness of global warming as abstract knowledge without taking any practical action. Hoexter identifies isolation/compartmentalization as the most common facet of soft denial.
2. "Climate providentialism" – In post-industrial society, modern comforts and disconnection from nature lead to an assumption that the climate "will provide" for humans, regardless of drastic changes. Though named for a belief found in some forms of Christianity, Hoexter uses the term in a secular context and relates it to anthropocentrism.
3. "Carbon gradualism" – An assumption that global warming can be addressed though minor "tweaks" conducted over extended periods of time. Proposals for more drastic change may be more realistic, but appear "radical" by comparison.
4. Substitutionism – A tendency among politically engaged people to "substitute a high-minded pre-existing activist cause" in place of the more immediate challenge of fossil fuel phase-out. Hoexter associates substitutionism with eco-socialism, green anarchism, and the climate justice movement, which he said tends to prioritize "laudable and important concerns about environmental justice and inequality" at the expense of "the future-looking fight to stabilize the climate."
5. Intellectualization – Engaging with climate change in a primarily academic context makes the issue an abstraction, lacking the visceral stimuli that prompt people to take concrete action.
6. Localism – Emphasis on "small" changes to improve one's local environment is a well-intentioned but limited response to a problem on the scale of global warming.
7. "Moral or intellectual narcissism" – Deriving a misplaced sense of superiority over "hard" climate deniers, soft deniers may come to believe that simply acknowledging the existence of climate change or expressing concern is sufficient by itself.
8. "Confirmation of pre-existing worldview" – Because of cognitive inertia, people may fail to integrate the significance or scale of climate change the framework of their existing beliefs, knowledge, and priorities.
9. Millenarianism – Activists become transfixed with a grand vision of an eventual, fundamental transformation of society, supplanting meaningful concrete action at the day-to-day level.
10. Sectarianism – Activists may become preoccupied with a particular vision of climate policy and become caught up in the narcissism of small differences, tedious debates, and far-flung hypotheticals to the detriment of more productive activity.
11. "Commitment to Hedonism" – The looming dread of climate change can emotionally overwhelm a person and may prompt a retreat into pleasure for its own sake. Alternately, people may indulge in pleasurable activities that they worry may not be readily accessible in a future society adapted to climate change.
12. "Entente with nihilism, defeatism, and depression" – In Hoexter's view, genuine nihilism remains a tendency within "hard" denialism; however, people who feel disempowered or overwhelmed about climate change may come to accept an uneasy coexistence with such nihilism.

== Examples ==
Opinions of five living demographic cohorts in the United States on climate change (Yellow bar is climate change denial.)

Soft climate denial has been ascribed to both liberals and conservatives, as well as proponents of market-based environmental policy instruments. It has also been used in self-criticism against tendencies toward complacency and inaction. Depending on perspective, sources may differ on whether a person engages in "soft" or "hard" denial (or neither). For example, the environmental policy of the Trump administration has been described as both "soft" and "hard" climate denial.

In Scientific American, Robert N. Proctor and Steve Lyons described Bret Stephens, a conservative New York Times opinion columnist and self-described "climate agnostic", as a soft denialist:

The irony is that Stephens himself seems to presume that climate science must be understood in political terms—as part of a larger struggle between liberals and conservatives. But the reality of climate change has nothing to do with politics: it's an atmospheric fact, not a political fact. And the whole idea of needing to keep 'an open mind' to a legitimate 'controversy' is the very essence of modern 'soft' denialism.

It was pointed out in 2017 that all the other current opinion columnists at the New York Times expressed varying degrees of soft denial in their work: "Like many liberals, every current liberal NYT columnist remains stuck in various states of 'soft' climate denial". This applied to the writing of Stephens's fellow conservatives (Ross Douthat and David Brooks) as well as his liberal colleagues (Maureen Dowd, David Leonhardt, Frank Bruni, Gail Collins, Charles Blow, Paul Krugman, Nicholas Kristof, Thomas Friedman, and Roger Cohen).

== See also ==
- Anti-environmentalism
- Barriers to pro-environmental behavior
- Environmental skepticism
- False consciousness
- Fear, uncertainty, and doubt
- Individual action on climate change
- Inoculation theory
- Motivated reasoning
- Pluralistic ignorance
- Status quo bias
