= Susan Saegert =

Professor of Environmental Psychology

- Born: Susan Saegert; 12 October 1946 (age 80)

Education
- Education: University of Michigan

Philosophical work
- Institutions: City University of New York, Graduate Center
- Main interests: Environmental psychology
- Website: Official website

Susan Saegert (born 12 October 1946) is an American professor of environmental psychology at the CUNY Graduate Center. She was previously professor of human and organizational development at Vanderbilt University (Peabody College) in Nashville, TN.

Prior to her appointment in 2008, Saegert was director of the Center for Human Environments (CHE) and professor of environmental psychology at the CUNY Graduate Center where she has worked since receiving her PhD in social psychology from the University of Michigan in 1974. She was also the first director of the Center for the Study of Women and Society at the CUNY Graduate Center.

== Education ==
Saegert gained her degree from the University of Texas in 1968, and her doctorate from the University of Michigan in 1974.

== Career ==
Saegert's early research focused on crowding and environmental stressors. She then began to study the relationship between housing and human development and well-being, as well as women and environments. These interests involved her with a team of architects, planners and housing finance experts in developing a plan for Downtown Denver that increased residential uses and amenities, which is evidenced in the cityscape of Denver today.

Her research in inner city communities led her to focus less on how housing conditions can affect residents and more on how communities can affect housing conditions. With colleagues at CHE in the Housing Environments Research Group (HERG), she and Gary Winkel have worked in partnership with community organizations and coalitions to understand how to successfully improve distressed housing and neighborhoods in New York City. This work has also resulted in a book on social capital co-edited with two political scientists: S. Saegert, J.P. Thompson, & M. R. Warren (Eds) Social capital and poor communities. New York: Russell Sage, 2001.

In 2007 she was quoted in David Gonzalez's New York Times' article "Risky loans help build ghost town of new homes" noting that in New York a trend is developing where “whole neighborhoods are wiped out, crime increases, the neighborhood’s reputation goes down, quality of life is undermined, and people can’t sell their houses,” due to the accessibility of adjustable rate loans and bad mortgages.

Her professional activities have included serving as president of Division 34 on Population and Environment of the American Psychological Association, co-chairing the Environmental Design Research Association, and more recently serving on the American Psychological Association's Task Force on Urban Psychology. She also chaired the American Psychological Association Task Force on Social and Economic Status (SES) which then became a standing committee of APA. She has served on the editorial boards of Environment & Behavior and the Journal of Environmental Psychology for most of the last 20 years. With Gary Winkel, she wrote the Annual Review of Environmental Psychology for 1990.

== Bibliography ==
=== Books ===
- Saegert, Susan (1974). Effects of spatial and social density on arousal, mood and social orientation (Ph.D Dissertation). New York: University of Michigan.
- Saegert, Susan; Leavitt, Jacqueline (1990). From abandonment to hope: community-households in Harlem. New York: Columbia University Press. ISBN 9780231068468. Reviewed by The New York Times, 23 February 1989.
- Saegert, Susan; Winkel, Gary (1997). Social capital formation in low income housing. New York: Housing Environments Research Group of the Center for Human Environments, City University of New York.
- Saegert, Susan; Thompson, J. Phillip; Warren, Mark (2001). Social capital and poor communities. New York: Russell Sage Foundation. ISBN 9780871547330.
- Saegert, Susan; DeFilippis, James (2008). The community development reader. New York: Routledge. ISBN 9780203935569.

=== Chapters in books ===
- Saegert, Susan (April 1996), "What we have to work with: the lessons of the task force surveys", in Saegert, Susan; Cotton, Michelle; Reiss, David (eds.), No more "housing of last resort": the importance of affordability and resident participation in In Rem housing, New York: The Task Force on City Owned Property (Distributed by the Parodneck Foundation), pp. 35–63
- Saegert, Susan; White, Andrew (1997), "Return from abandonment: the tenant interim lease program and the development of low-income cooperatives in New York City's most neglected neighborhoods", in Vilet, Willem (ed.), Affordable housing and urban redevelopment in the United States, Thousand Oaks, California: Sage Publications, pp. 158–180, ISBN 9780803970519
- Saegert, Susan (1997), "What is the situation: a comment on the Fourth Japan-USA seminar on environment-behavior research", in Wapner, Seymour; Demick, Jack; Yamamoto, Takiji; et al. (eds.), Handbook of Japan-United States environment-behavior research: toward a transactional approach, New York: Plenum Press, pp. 385–398, ISBN 9780306453403
- Saegert, Susan (1998), "Rem housing (definition of)", in Vilet, Willem (ed.), The encyclopedia of housing, Thousand Oaks, California: Sage Publications, pp. 309–310, ISBN 9780761913320
- Saegert, Susan; McCarthy, Dolores E. (1998), "What is the situation: a comment on the Fourth Japan-USA seminar on environment-behavior research", in Scheidt, Rick J.; Windley, Paul G. (eds.), Environment and aging theory: a focus on housing, Westport, Connecticut: Greenwood Press, pp. 61–87, ISBN 9780313283895
- Saegert, Susan; Evans, Gary W. (2000), "Residential crowding in the context of inner city poverty", in Wapner, Seymour; Demick, Jack; Yamamoto, Takiji; et al. (eds.), Theoretical perspectives in environment-behavior research: underlying assumptions, research problems, and methodologies, New York: Kluwer Academic/Plenum Publishers, pp. 247–268, ISBN 9780306461927
- Saegert, Susan (2000), "Urban communities", in Kazdin, Alan E. (ed.), Encyclopedia of psychology, vol. 8, Washington, D.C. Oxford Oxfordshire New York: American Psychological Association Oxford University Press, pp. 144–147, ISBN 9781557986573
- Saegert, Susan; Clark, Heléne (2006), "Opening doors: what a right to housing means for women", in Hartman, Chester; Bratt, Rachel G.; Stone, Michael (eds.), A right to housing: foundation for a new social agenda, Philadelphia, Pennsylvania: Temple University Press, pp. 296–315, ISBN 9781592134328

=== Journal articles ===
- Saegert, Susan; Winkel, Gary H (February 1990). "Environmental psychology". Annual Review of Psychology. 41: 441–477. doi:10.1146/annurev.ps.41.020190.002301.
- Saegert, Susan; Winkel, Gary H (August 1996). "Paths to community empowerment: organizing at home". American Journal of Community Psychology. 24 (4): 517–550. doi:10.1007/bf02506795. S2CID 145155560.
- Saegert, Susan; Winkel, Gary H (1998). "Social capital and the revitalization of New York City's distressed inner-city housing". Housing Policy Debate. 9 (1): 17–60. doi:10.1080/10511482.1998.9521285.
- Saegert, Susan; Winkel, Gary H (March–April 1999). "CDCs, social capital, and housing quality". Shelterforce (104). Archived from the original on 1999-10-02.
- Saegert, Susan; Winkel, Gary H; Swartz, Charles (2002). "Social capital and crime in New York City's low-income housing". Housing Policy Debate. 13 (1): 189–226. doi:10.1080/10511482.2002.9521439. S2CID 53694379.
- Saegert, Susan; Klitzman, Susan; Freudenberg, Nicholas; Cooperman-Mroczek, Jana; Nassar, Salwa (September 2003). "Healthy housing: a structured review of published evaluations of US interventions to improve health by modifying housing in the United States, 1990–2001". American Journal of Public Health. 93 (9): 1471–1478. doi:10.2105/AJPH.93.9.1471. PMC 1447995. PMID 12948965.
- Saegert, Susan; Evans, Gary W (July 2003). "Poverty, housing niches, and health in the United States". Journal of Social Issues. 59 (3): 569–589. doi:10.1111/1540-4560.00078.
- Saegert, Susan; Winkel, Gary H (December 2004). "Crime, social capital and community participation". American Journal of Community Psychology. 34 (3–4): 219–233. doi:10.1007/s10464-004-7416-2. PMID 15663208. S2CID 8325843.
- Saegert, Susan; Benítez, Lymari (May 2005). "Limited equity housing cooperatives: defining a niche in the low-income housing market". Journal of Planning Literature. 19 (4): 427–439. doi:10.1177/0885412204274169. S2CID 67808249.
- Saegert, Susan (June 2006). "Building civic capacity in urban neighborhoods: an empirically grounded anatomy". Journal of Urban Affairs. 28 (3): 275–294. doi:10.1111/j.1467-9906.2006.00292.x. S2CID 144459310.

=== Papers ===
- Saegert, Susan; Engle, Robert; Thompson, J. Phillip; Sargent, Jocelyn (1999), Stretched thin: employment, parenting, and social capital among mothers in public housing, New York: New York: Foundation for Child Development Working Paper Series
