= List of Texas Longhorns head football coaches =

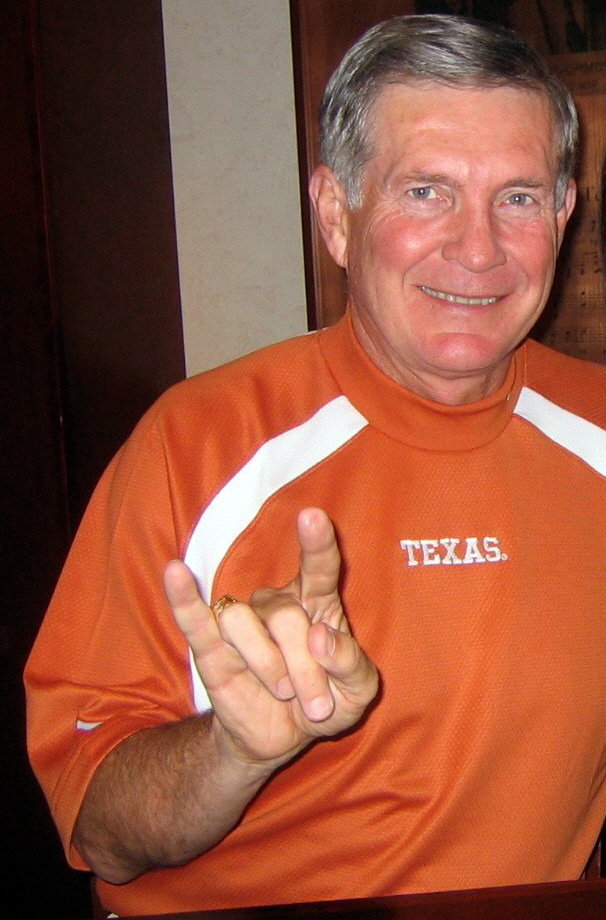
Mack Brown was head coach of the program from 1998 to 2013.

The Texas Longhorns football program is a college football team that represents the University of Texas at Austin of the SEC Conference in the National Collegiate Athletic Association. The team has had 28 head coaches since it started playing organized football in 1893 with the nickname Longhorns, although they played without a head coach in their first season. Texas was an original member of the Southwest Conference, joining in 1915. The Longhorns became a charter member of the Big 12 in 1996 when the Southwest Conference disbanded. The Longhorns have played in 1,200 games during their 117 seasons. In those seasons, 10 coaches have led Texas to postseason bowl games: Dana X. Bible, Blair Cherry, Ed Price, Darrell Royal, Fred Akers, David McWilliams, John Mackovic, Mack Brown, Charlie Strong, Tom Herman, and Steve Sarkisian.

Eleven coaches have won conference championships with the Longhorns: Berry Whitaker, Clyde Littlefield, Bible, Cherry, Price, Royal, Akers, McWilliams, Mackovic, Brown, and Sarkisian. Royal and Brown have also won national championships with Texas.

Royal is the all-time leader in games coached (219), years coached (20) and total wins (167). Frank Crawford has the highest winning percentage of any Longhorn coach after going 5–0 his only year. Of coaches who served more than one season, Whitaker leads with a .865 winning percentage. Charlie Strong trails with a .455 winning percentage. Of the 28 Longhorns coaches, Bible, Royal, and Brown have been inducted into the College Football Hall of Fame. Royal and Brown have each received National Coach of the Year honors from at least one organization. The current head coach of the Longhorns is Steve Sarkisian.

== Key ==
General
#	A running total of the number of coaches
CCs	Conference championships (Note: Texas did not join a conference until 1915.)
NCs	National Championships
†	Elected to the College Football Hall of Fame

Overall games
GC	Games coached
OW	Wins
OL	Losses
OT	Ties (Note: Overtime rules in college football were introduced in 1996, making ties impossible in the period since.)
O%	Winning percentage (Note: When computing the win–loss percentage, a tie counts as half a win and half a loss.)

Conference games
CW	Wins
CL	Losses
CT	Ties
C%	Winning percentage

Postseason games
PW	Wins
PL	Losses
PT	Ties

== Coaches ==
List of head football coaches showing season(s) coached, overall records, conference records, postseason records, championships and selected awards (Note: Statistics correct as of the end of the 2015 NCAA Division I FBS football season.)
#	Name	Term	seasons	GC	OW	OL	OT	O%	CW	CL	CT	C%	PW	PL	PT	CCs	NCs	National awards
1	R. D. Wentworth	1894	1	7	6	1	0	.857	—	—	—	—	—	—	—	—	—	—
2	Frank Crawford	1895	1	5	5	0	0	1.000	—	—	—	—	—	—	—	—	—	—
3	Harry Orman Robinson	1896	1	7	4	2	1	.643	—	—	—	—	—	—	—	—	—	—
4	Walter F. Kelly	1897	1	8	6	2	0	.750	—	—	—	—	—	—	—	—	—	—
5	David Farragut Edwards	1898	1	6	5	1	0	.833	—	—	—	—	—	—	—	—	—	—
6	Maurice Gordon Clarke	1899	1	8	6	2	0	.750	—	—	—	—	—	—	—	—	—	—
7	Samuel Huston Thompson	1900–1901	2	17	14	2	1	.853	—	—	—	—	—	—	—	—	—	—
8	J. B. Hart	1902	1	10	6	3	1	.650	—	—	—	—	—	—	—	—	—	—
9	Ralph Hutchinson	1903–1905	3	25	16	7	2	.680	—	—	—	—	—	—	—	—	—	—
10	H. R. Schenker	1906	1	10	9	1	0	.900	—	—	—	—	—	—	—	—	—	—
11	W. E. Metzenthin	1907–1908	2	17	11	5	1	.676	—	—	—	—	—	—	—	—	—	—
12	Dexter Draper	1909	1	8	4	3	1	.563	—	—	—	—	—	—	—	—	—	—
13	Billy Wasmund	1910	1	8	6	2	0	.750	—	—	—	—	—	—	—	—	—	—
14	Dave Allerdice	1911–1915	5	40	33	7	0	.825	2	2	0	.500	—	—	—	—	—	—
15	Eugene Van Gent	1916	1	9	7	2	0	.778	5	1	0	.833	—	—	—	1	—	—
16	Bill Juneau	1917–1919	3	26	19	7	0	.731	9	5	0	.643	—	—	—	1	—	—
17	Berry M. Whitaker	1920–1922	3	26	22	3	1	.865	8	1	1	.850	—	—	—	1	—	—
18	E. J. Stewart	1923–1926	4	36	24	9	3	.708	8	8	3	.500	—	—	—	—	—	—
19	Clyde Littlefield	1927–1933	7	68	44	18	6	.691	22	13	4	.615	—	—	—	2	—	—
20	Jack Chevigny	1934–1936	3	29	13	14	2	.483	6	11	1	.361	—	—	—	—	—	—
21	Dana X. Bible^{†}	1937–1946	10	97	63	31	3	.665	35	22	1	.612	2	0	1	3	—	—
22	Blair Cherry	1947–1950	4	43	32	10	1	.756	18	5	1	.771	2	1	0	1	—	—
23	Ed Price	1951–1956	6	61	33	27	1	.549	20	15	1	.569	1	0	0	2	—	—
24	Darrell Royal^{†}	1957–1976	20	219	167	47	5	.774	109	27	2	.797	8	7	1	11	3	Eddie Robinson Coach of the Year (1961, 1963); AFCA Coach of the Year (1963, 1969)
25	Fred Akers	1977–1986	10	119	86	31	2	.731	60	19	1	.756	2	7	0	2	—	—
26	David McWilliams	1987–1991	5	57	31	26	0	.544	23	15	0	.605	1	1	0	1	—	—
27	John Mackovic	1992–1997	6	71	41	28	2	.592	28	16	0	.636	1	2	—	3	—	—
28	Mack Brown^{†}	1998–2013	16	206	158	48	—	.767	98	33	—	.748	10	5	—	2	1	Paul "Bear" Bryant Award (2005); Bobby Dodd Coach of the Year Award (2008)
29	Charlie Strong	2014–2016	3	37	16	21	—	.432	12	15	—	.444	0	1	—	—	—	—
30	Tom Herman	2017–2020	4	50	32	18	—	.640	22	13	—	.629	4	0	—	—	—	—
31	Steve Sarkisian	2021–present	5	68	48	20	—	.706	30	13	—	.698	3	3	—	1	—	—
