= Van Vleet =

Van Vleet or Vanvleet is a surname. Notable people with the surname include:

- Fred VanVleet (born 1994), American basketball player
- Louisa Van Vleet Spicer Wright (1862–1913), American physician
- Mike Vanvleet (born 1970), American baseball umpire

== See also ==
- Lacy-Van Vleet House, historic house in Tompkins County, New York, United States
- Lewis and Elizabeth Van Vleet House, historic house in Portland, Oregon, United States
- Van Vleet, Mississippi
- Van Vliet, surname
- Van Fleet, surname
