= Van Fleet =

Van Fleet is a surname; it is an Americanized spelling of the Dutch surname van Vliet. Notable people with the surname include:

- Beth Van Fleet (born 1977), American beach volleyball player
- James Van Fleet (1892–1992), United States Army officer
- Jo Van Fleet (1914–1996), American actress
- Melissa VanFleet (born 1986), American singer-songwriter
- Vernon W. Van Fleet (c. 1866–1932), chair of the Federal Trade Commission
- William Cary Van Fleet (1852–1923), American judge
- Gretna Van Fleet, a resident of Frankenmuth, Michigan whose name was used in an altered form as the name of the band Greta Van Fleet

== See also ==
- Van Vleet
