= Gary Winkel =

American environmental psychologist (1938–2025)

Gary H. Winkel
- Born: March 24, 1938; Los Angeles, California, U.S.
- Died: January 6, 2025 (aged 86)

Education
- Education: University of Washington

Philosophical work
- Institutions: City University of New York, Graduate Center
- Main interests: Environmental psychology
- Website: Official website

Gary Henry Winkel (March 24, 1938 – January 6, 2025) was an American environmental psychologist noted for his contribution to the establishment of the Environment and Behavior, a journal seen as an indication of the recent growth of Environmental Psychology as a field. He was a professor of Environmental Psychology at the Graduate Center of the City University of New York and a Research Professor in the Department of Health Behavior and Policy at the Icahn School of Medicine at Mount Sinai.

== Life and career ==
Winkel was born in Alhambra, California. After graduating with a B.A. in psychology from the University of California, Los Angeles, Winkel received his Ph.D. in psychology at the University of Washington with a minor in quantitative methods. After receiving his degree, he served as an assistant professor of Architecture and Urban Planning at the University of Washington for two years. During his schooling and professorship at the University of Washington, he was involved in research on museum and exhibit design of the 1964 and 1965 World’s Fair as well as the National Gallery of Art and National History Museum at the Smithsonian Institution. He also played an integral role in the research that informed the redevelopment of downtown Seattle, Washington, and, subsequently, additional issues including highway design, subway stations, hospital design, home and housing, social capital, and neighborhood change.

Winkel joined the Environmental Psychology Program at the Graduate Center of the City University of New York at its birth in 1968, remaining there as a Professor until he retired in 2011. There, in collaboration with William Ittelson, Harold Proshansky, and Leanne Rivlin, he was the co-author of the first textbook in environmental psychology titled Introduction to Environmental Psychology. In a study undertaken with Geoffrey Hayward, Winkel observed people in New York City subway stations to investigate the causes of congestion and suggested improvements to different elements in the public space. Additionally, he began working with Professor Susan Saegert of the Environmental Psychology Program on housing and community related research. During this period, Winkel also worked jointly with Philip Thiel and Francis Ventre on the development of the first interdisciplinary journal focused on person/environment relationships. The journal was called Environment and Behavior and he served as its first editor in 1969, continuing until 1980. Winkel maintained that the jit was intended to provide a platform for the discussion of the relationships between physical environment and behavior.

Winkel’s research interests included the role of community in housing development, hospital design, intervention testing and design, and research and statistical methods for field research. Among his many generative roles, Winkel directed a National Institute of Mental Health training grant in Environmental Psychology between 1981 and 1985. He also taught in the Architecture Department at Yale University from 1969 to 1983. He received the Distinguished Service Award from the Environmental Design Research Association in 1989 in recognition of his role as founding editor of Environment and Behavior.

After retiring from CUNY, Winkel worked for 12 years as a Biostatistician with the Icahn School of Medicine at Mount Sinai on cancer research, having earlier in his career consulted on research and design at Bellevue Hospital in New York City. Winkel was important to the behavioral cancer research at Mount Sinai. He brought his refinement with a wide range of forefront statistical techniques to interdisciplinary research on how individuals and families cope with illness and to field studies in cancer prevention, awareness, risk, and detection. In addition to providing biostatistical consultation, he was key to advancing research design, specifically field research in environmental psychology.

The range of Winkel’s work is extraordinary. He was the author of several books including Perception of Neighborhood Change (1978), Black Families in White Neighborhoods: Experiences and Attitudes (1974), and Social capital formation in low income housing. New York: Housing Environments Research Group of the Center for Human Environments, City University of New York (with Susan Saegert, 1997), as well as co-author of the first environmental psychology textbook An Introduction to Environmental Psychology (with William Ittelson, Harold Proshansky, and Leann Rivlin). Among numerous scientific articles that also emerged from Winkel’s research at the Housing Environments Research Group is “Crime, Social Capital, and Community” in the American Journal of Community Psychology (with Susan Saegert, 2004). Among the more than seventy-five journal articles and book chapters he has authored are those published in journals as diverse as Architecture and Behavior and Arthritis and Rheumatism.

Winkel died on January 6, 2025, at the age of 86. Winkel is survived by his wife, Dr. Rachel Lynn Manes, and their son, Marc. Winkel was a cook who enjoyed providing French cuisine for his family. His love for and knowledge of art history was unmatched. He was a member of the New York Philharmonic and an active participant at Dizzy’s Jazz Club performances. He was also a member of the Democratic party and supported social causes that promoted women. His record of contributing to the betterment of people from all walks of life and, in particular, helping them learn how to think analytically was truly remarkable. Winkel’s legacy, his generous gifts of teaching and learning, lives on indefinitely in his family, colleagues, students, and friends.

== Selected bibliography ==
=== Books ===
- Winkel, Gary; Saegert, Susan (1997). Social capital formation in low income housing. New York: Housing Environments Research Group of the Center for Human Environments, City University of New York.

=== Journal articles ===
- Winkel, Gary; Saegert, Susan (February 1990). "Environmental psychology". Annual Review of Psychology. 41: 441–477. doi:10.1146/annurev.ps.41.020190.002301.
- Winkel, Gary; Saegert, Susan (August 1996). "Paths to community empowerment: organizing at home". American Journal of Community Psychology. 24 (4): 517–550. doi:10.1007/BF02506795. S2CID 145155560.
- Winkel, Gary; Saegert, Susan (1998). "Social capital and the revitalization of New York City's distressed inner‐city housing". Housing Policy Debate. 9 (1): 17–60. doi:10.1080/10511482.1998.9521285.
- Winkel, Gary; Saegert, Susan (March–April 1999). "CDCs, social capital, and housing quality". Shelterforce (104). National Housing Institute - Shelterforce online. Archived from the original on 1999-10-02.
- Winkel, Gary; Saegert, Susan; Swartz, Charles (2002). "Social capital and crime in New York City's low‐income housing". Housing Policy Debate. 13 (1): 189–226. doi:10.1080/10511482.2002.9521439. S2CID 53694379.
- Winkel, Gary; Saegert, Susan (December 2004). "Crime, social capital and community participation". American Journal of Community Psychology. 34 (3–4): 219–233. doi:10.1007/s10464-004-7416-2. PMID 15663208. S2CID 8325843.
