= History of Texas Longhorns football =

The Texas Longhorns football team represents the University of Texas at Austin in college football.

== History ==
=== Early history (1893–1956) ===
The University of Texas fielded its first permanent football team in 1893, managed by Albert Lefevra, the secretary-treasurer of the UT Athletic Association. The team played four games, a pair in the fall and two more in the spring, winning all four games while shutting out all four opponents. The first was against the Dallas Football Club that claimed to be the best in the state. Held at the Dallas Fair Grounds, the game attracted a then-record 1,200 onlookers. It was a tough and spirited match, but when the dust had settled, the "University Eleven" had pulled off an 18–16 upset. "Our name is pants, and our glory has departed", growled the Dallas Daily News. The Texas club would go on to a spotless record and earn the undisputed boast of "best in Texas." After the inaugural season Texas officially hired its first coach, R.D. Wentworth, for $325 plus expenses. Wentworth shut out the first six opponents, outscoring them 191–0 before miserably losing their final game to Missouri 28–0. There were a number of firsts in Wentworth's one and only season as head coach at Texas. Texas' first ever meeting against Texas A&M occurred in 1894 and resulted in a 38–0 shutout victory for Texas in Austin. Texas also faced Arkansas in the first meeting between the two schools in 1894. The game resulted in a 54–0 shutout victory for Texas as well. These two firsts set the ground for the long extensive rivalries with the Aggies and the Razorbacks over the next century in which Texas would dominate both series with the two schools including several anticipated games. The 1896 Texas varsity was the first team to play out of state, as the team ventured east for games against Tulane (a 12–4 victory) and LSU (a 14–0 loss). The games were played on a Saturday and Monday in New Orleans and Baton Rouge, respectively, which was a particularly brutal travel schedule for that time.

Texas quickly established a winning tradition in its first seven years of football going 36–11–2. The Texas football program quickly rose to prominence during the early 1900s with winning records each season, including undefeated seasons in 1900, 1914, 1918, and 1920. In 1900, Texas had its first ever meeting with Oklahoma, a 28–2 victory for Texas. During this same period, Texas also began rivalries with TCU, Texas A&M, Baylor, and Vanderbilt teams, where Texas quickly became the powerhouse and favored team. Texas participated in the Texas Intercollegiate Athletic Association from 1913 to 1917, winning two titles in 1913 and 1914 with 7–1 and 8–0 records those years. In 1914, standout halfback Len Barrell scored 14 touchdowns and kicked 34 extra points and one field goal to tally 121 points for the Longhorns. He held the UT record for points in a season for 83 years before Ricky Williams broke it in 1997 and again in 1998. Texas was selected as National Champions in 1914 by the Billingsley Report Ratings after finishing 8–0 on the season; this championship is recognized by the NCAA. In 1915, Texas joined the upstart Southwest ConferenceI, winning the conference championship in 1916 and 1918. In 1916, 15,000 fans packed Clark Field to witness Texas’ 21–7 upset win against Texas A&M. It was the first UT vs. A&M game in Austin since 1909 and the first game in which the first Bevo was unveiled. Texas was again selected as National Champions in 1918 by the Cliff Morgan Ratings when the team went undefeated at 9–0. Texas then won their first outright SWC Championship in 1920 with an undefeated record. 1920 was also the year in which the Texas–Texas A&M rivalry took hold with this historical meeting as both teams entered the game undefeated and unscored on that season. 20,000 onlookers (the largest in state history at the time) witnessed a back and forth defensive battle as Texas defeated Texas A&M, 7–3 on Thanksgiving Day. The game gave the Aggies their first loss in two years and closed another undefeated season for Texas. Texas would post a 35–6–3 record over the next five seasons led by coaches Berry Whitaker and Edward J. "Doc" Stewart through the 1926 season. Three of those losses came to Vanderbilt.

Clyde Littlefield was the first superstar to both play for and coach the Longhorns. In his first season as head coach, he led Texas to a 6–2–1 record, bettering Edward Stewarts previous record of 5–4. His first season included a hard-fought victory over a then-tough Vanderbilt team in Dallas 13–6. During his second season, he won the SWC going 7–2 including huge shutout wins over TCU and Texas A&M. The 1928 Longhorns were the first to wear "Texas orange" (burnt orange) jerseys. The change was made because the bright orange jerseys UT had worn faded from repeated washings. Burnt orange jerseys were worn for the next decade until a wartime dye shortage forced UT to go back to the bright orange. Burnt orange was not re-adopted until Darrell Royal did so prior to the 1962 season. Littlefield also won another SWC Championship in 1930 and led his team to a near perfect 8–1–1 record. The following season saw Texas finish at 5–2–2 in 1929. The 1930 season was most remembered by the 98-yard touchdown drive against Oklahoma where both teams were tied 7–7 going into the fourth quarter. Texas managed to tack on a field goal to put the game away, 17–7 and their fourth straight win over the Sooners at the time. The 1930 team won the SWC Championship and was selected as the National Champion that year by several sportswriters however the school does not officially recognize this year. Littlefield almost captured another SWC Title in 1932 by finishing 8–2 but lost to SWC foe TCU 14–0. Throughout the 1930s Texas' main in-conference foe was TCU as both teams sought after recruits within the state. Coach Littlefield only had one losing season, in 1933, mainly due to younger players and injuries to starters. From 1893 to 1932, Texas had 40 consecutive winning seasons. After finishing the 1933 season 4–5–2, the Longhorns' first losing season in program history, many people called for his resignation. Littlefield ultimately gave in to the calling of his resignation and left the head coaching position in 1933. He resigned as the Longhorns football coach but stayed on as a very successful track coach. To this day, he is still the fifth most successful coach for the University of Texas with a record of 44–18–6. After the resignation, Jack Chevigny, a national celebrity and ex-Notre Dame player, was hired in 1934. His first season as head coach included a stunning victory over Notre Dame, 7–6, in South Bend, Indiana which was considered the greatest moment of his career and one of Texas' biggest victories at the time. After his initial winning season of 7–2–1 (often credited to Littlefield), Chevigny's career at Texas came crashing down when the Longhorns went 4–6 in 1935 and 2–6–1 in 1936, after which he resigned. Chevigny's coaching tenure never fully developed after the victory at Notre Dame. After his resignation he joined the Marine Corps as many people enlisted during the early stages of World War II. Chevigny died as a United States Marine Corps first lieutenant in the battle of Iwo Jima during World War II. Another legend surrounding Chevigny is that, after the 1934 victory over Notre Dame, he had been presented a fountain pen with the inscription "To Jack Chevigny, a Notre Dame boy who beat Notre Dame", and that on September 2, 1945, the pen was discovered in the hands of one of the Japanese envoys on the U.S.S. Missouri; and that the inscription was changed to read, "To Jack Chevigny, a Notre Dame boy who gave his life for his country in the spirit of old Notre Dame."[3] Chevigny was the only head coach in Texas football history with a losing record of 13–14–2 until Charlie Strong was fired in 2016.

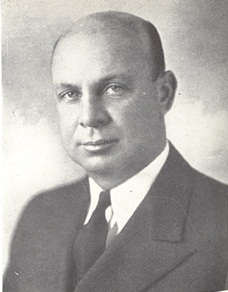
Coach Bible revitalized Texas in 1937

After the 1936 season Texas decided to pursue a head coach with extensive experience in the position. The coach chosen to replace Jack Chevigny after the 1936 season was Dana X. Bible. In the middle of the Great Depression, Texas courted and hired Bible to be the coach and athletics director at The University of Texas. Dana X. Bible had tremendous success at Nebraska and previously Texas A&M. It was a bold move by the university and a decision that would lay the foundation of the modern legacy for the Texas Football program. The Bible era debuted in 1937 with a 25–12 victory over Texas Tech in Austin. Texas would only win two games in Bible's initial year as head coach in 1937 over Texas Tech and a stunning defensive battle over No. 4 Baylor, 9–6. The 1938 season would not be any better as Texas' only victory of the season was a 7–6 victory over rival Texas A&M in Austin, the final game of the season. Fans were anxious to witness Texas once again dominate the college football scene however the program would be in a transition period for a short time, but with the experience that Bible brought Texas was again recruiting good athletes. After two initial rough seasons where Texas only won three games, Bible successfully transformed Texas into a national powerhouse. The 1939 season would prove different as Texas opened with a shutout win over Florida 12–0 followed by a 17–7 victory at Wisconsin. Then the turning point came in October 1939 when Texas was playing Arkansas in Austin. Down 13–7 with under 30 seconds to play, and with many fans heading for the stadium exits, Texas fullback R.B. Patrick flipped a short pass to Texas' halfback Jack Crain and ran 67 yards untouched for the score in the waning seconds of the game to tie Arkansas at 13. Those same fans that were leaving the stadium came pouring back in and onto the field. After the field was cleared Crain booted the extra point and Texas defeated Arkansas 14–13. This game became known as the "Renaissance Game" of the Dana X. Bible era, and the win revitalized the Texas football program in 1939. National championship talks began thereafter when Texas compiled their first All-American's with Malcolm Kutner, Jack Crain, and Noble Doss. The 1939 season was pivotal in providing momentum for the following decade as Texas would again become one of the most successful teams throughout the 1940s. The 1940 season carried the momentum from the previous year as Texas was officially ranked in the AP poll for the first time. After an 8–2 season in 1940 where Noble Doss made the infamous "Impossible Catch" to set up Texas' 7–0 victory over Texas A&M kept the Aggies from repeating as National Champions and appearing in the Rose Bowl. In 1941, Bible then led the Longhorns to their 1st No. 1 ranking in 1941 during the season and finished the year 8–1–1 where many sportswriters named the 1941 team National Champions however they were not selected by the AP Poll that year. The 1941 Texas team is however recognized by the NCAA as National Champions. Texas won its first six games of the season, three by shutouts. After a 34–0 win over Southern Methodist, the Longhorns reached No. 1 in the polls and seemed destined for the Rose Bowl until a 7–7 tie in Waco against Baylor. SMU coach Matty Bell proclaimed UT as "the greatest team in Southwest Conference history ... even better than my Rose Bowl team of 1935." When the Longhorns arrived back at their dormitory from beating the Mustangs, "Miss Grif", the house mother, placed a long-stemmed rose on each plate at the dinner table. Texas anxiously awaited their opportunity to receive a Rose Bowl bid having turned down bids from the Cotton, Orange, and Sugar Bowls that year. Rose Bowl officials elected not to award the bid to Texas since they had one remaining game against Oregon, who had already lost to Oregon State earlier that year. After not being awarded the bid, Texas then took out its frustration on Oregon, overwhelming them 71–7. The Longhorns of 1941 were featured on the cover of Life Magazine, and are still to this day considered one of the greatest Texas teams of all time. The Longhorns of 1941 were the first Texas team to reach the No. 1 ranking in the AP poll. It was the first Texas team to have consensus All-Americans selected and the first to win the inaugural hat-inspired trophy for the winner of the Texas-Oklahoma game at the State Fair. Also, because of the 1941 Longhorns, fans first burned red candles at a hex rally against Texas A&M. They even escorted the team with a torchlight parade, another tradition that still lives today.

In 1942, Bible led Texas to a 9–2 season record and their first ever bowl game where the Longhorns represented the Southwest Conference in the 1943 Cotton Bowl Classic. Prior to the game, radio announcers in Georgia boasted that Texas didn't belong in the same league as Georgia Tech. Texas defeated the highly ranked Georgia Tech 14–7 with an incredible defensive effort that held the high scoring Yellow Jacket rush offense to only 57 yards. This would be the first of 22 appearances in the Cotton Bowl Classic for Texas. In 1943, Bible again led Texas to the Southwest Conference Championship and another Cotton Bowl Classic berth where they faced the only military institute to play in that bowl game, Randolph Field. The game was played during some of the state's harshest weather conditions during that year. The game resulted in a 7–7 tie. Bible's teams went 32–6–2 from 1940 to 1943. 1944 was a reloading year for the Horns as many starters graduated the previous season or were serving in the military. A young quarterback named Bobby Layne took over the starting position and again Texas was dominating its opponents. In 1945, with the help of quarterback Bobby Layne and All-American Hub Bechtol, Bible led the Longhorn to their first 10-victory season which ended in a dramatic 40–27 Cotton Bowl Classic victory over Missouri. Lane scored almost all of Texas' 40 points himself; he ran in four touchdowns, he threw two passes for touchdowns, and he kicked four extra points. The 1945 team was even selected by several sportswriters as the National Champion, but again the AP poll did not select them. The following year in 1946 Texas was picked as the preseason No. 1 team again, but 2 losses dropped them in the polls. 1946 was highlighted with a 20–13 victory over Oklahoma. Bible's final season as head coach in 1946 resulted in an 8–2 record, going out with a 24–7 win over rival Texas A&M. Over his tenure at Texas, Bible acquired three Southwest Conference titles in 1942, 1943, 1945, two Cotton Bowl Classic victories with a post season record of 2–0–1 while the teams of 1941 and 1945 were selected as National Champions by various polling organizations. In 1946 Bible retired from coaching but stayed on as athletic director and is credited for the hiring of Darrell Royal. Bible is still to this day the fourth-most successful coach in Texas history with a record of 63–31–3 and responsible for revitalizing the Texas football program as a national powerhouse. Despite not winning a recognized national championship, Bible laid the foundation for the Texas football program and for future head coaches. Through his "Bible Plan", he inspired his players not only to succeed on the field but also to succeed in the classroom and in life. He is credited for originally revitalizing the Texas football program in the late 1930s and regarded as the first legendary head coach for the Texas football program. His teams of the late 1930s and throughout the 1940s are still regarded as some of the best in school history. Bible was inducted into the College Football Hall of Fame as a coach in 1951.

Handpicked by Bible as his successor, was Blair Cherry in 1947. Cherry in 1947 with a veteran squad, including All-American quarterback Bobby Layne, led the Longhorns to a near-perfect record of 10–1, defeating No. 6 Alabama 27–7 in the Sugar Bowl and finished the year ranked fifth nationally in his first season of 1947. A chartered DC-4 provided the transportation, as the Texas football team used air travel for the first time for its 1947 game at Oregon. The trip, though reportedly very rough, didn't slow UT as Longhorn senior quarterback Bobby Layne outdueled Oregon sophomore Norm Van Brocklin in Texas’ 38–13 win. Layne would finish his career at Texas with a best 28–6 record and was named the MVP of the 1948 Sugar Bowl win against Alabama. The 1947 season saw Texas defeat rival Oklahoma for the eighth straight season. The 1947 team was even selected as National Champions by the Massey Ratings, but again the AP poll did not select them. Cherry's 1948 team led by fullback, Tom Landry, went 7–3–1, including a 41–28 win over No. 8 Georgia in the Orange Bowl. Cherry's 1950 team was considered one of the best in Texas history highlighted by a 23–20 win over No. 1 SMU where Texas held their No. 1 leading rusher with a negative 27 yards. Only a one-point loss to Oklahoma kept Texas from a perfect season that year. Texas went on to win the Southwest Conference title going 9–2 overall and was ranked No. 3 nationally. In November 1950, Cherry announced that he would resign from Texas to enter the oil business at the conclusion of the 1950 season. Three weeks after announcing his resignation, Cherry was hospitalized with an ulcer and a respiratory infection. He later disclosed that the overemphasis on winning led to his resignation. During his four-year reign Cherry was 32–10–1 leading the Longhorns to three bowl games (two victorious) and two of top-five national rankings. The 1950 team was also selected as National Champions by several polls, but AP poll kept Texas ranked third.

After Cherry's abrupt resignation, Ed Price was promoted to head coach in 1951. In his first three seasons, Price carried over the success of Bible and Cherry, leading the Longhorns to three winning seasons from 1951 to 1953, a shutout 16–0, victory over Tennessee in the Cotton Bowl Classic, and two Southwest Conference titles. From 1939 to 1953 Texas had dominated the college football scene with a record of 115–35–3 (77%), but in 1954 Texas went 4–5–1, its first losing season in 15 years. 1954 started off with a 20–6 victory over LSU however the season was downhill from that point as Texas went 4–5–1. The 1955 season did not fare any better as Texas went 5–5 on the season. The Price era never kept the Texas football program up to their standards of earlier decades. After capping a string of three losing seasons with a 1–9 season (the worst record in the school's history) in 1956, Price tendered his resignation in 1956. The program had gone from one of college football's most successful programs in 1953 to one of the worst in 1956. Price compiled a record of 33–27–1 in six seasons.

=== Darrell Royal era (1957–1976) ===
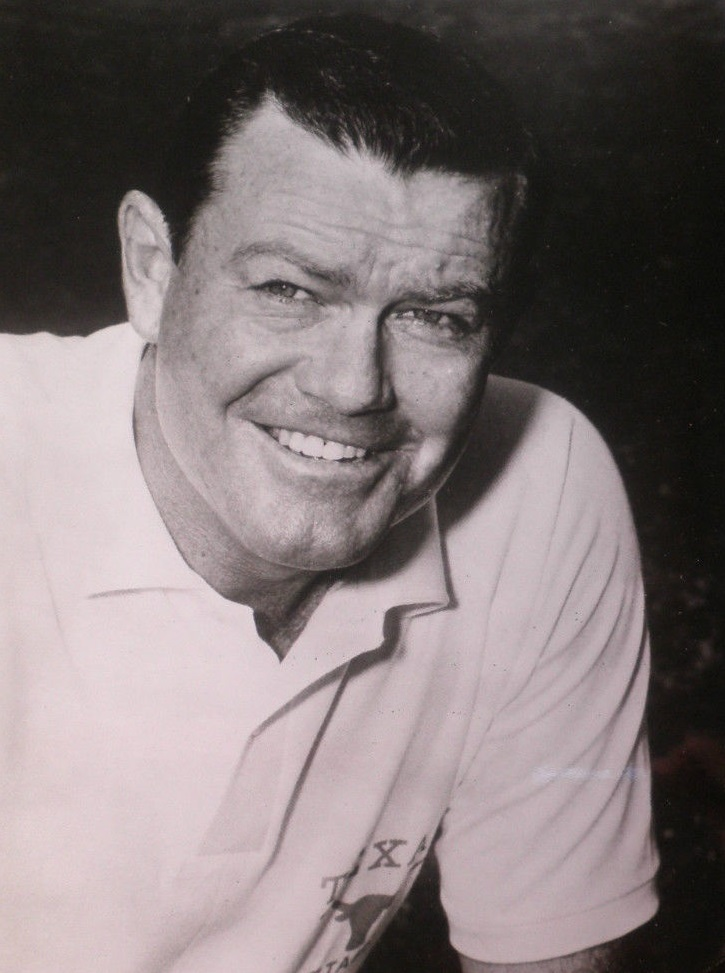
Coach Royal

Darrell K Royal, a native Oklahoman, previously served as head coach at Mississippi State and Washington before being hired for the head coaching job at Texas. With the guidance of former head coach Bible, Royal was tasked with bringing Texas back to prominence in 1957. He was destined to take the program to an even higher level. The Royal era of Texas football debuted in 1957 with a 26–7 win at Georgia. In Royal's first season he immediately turned things around for the program, taking the previous 1–9 Longhorns to 6–4–1 in 1957 the quickest turn-around among NCAA teams. The 1957 Longhorns obtained a No. 11 ranking, defeated a highly ranked Texas A&M team 9–7, and played in the Sugar Bowl. The following year proved even better as Texas went 7–3 in 1958. The immediate turnaround by Royal was praised heavily by Texas fans and the media. In 1959, Texas opened the season with a 20–0 victory over Nebraska in Lincoln. Texas also defeated No. 2 Oklahoma 15–14 to end a six-game losing streak to their rival and posted a 9–1 regular season record, with a Cotton Bowl berth against top-ranked Syracuse. Royal's teams of the 1960s and 1970s are regarded as some of the best in school history. The 1961 Longhorns posted a 9–1 regular season record, achieved a No. 1 ranking in November, and won the Cotton Bowl. The 1962 team posted a 9–0–1 regular season record and returned to the Cotton Bowl.

In his seventh season, Royal, with the help of star linebacker Tommy Nobis and quarterback Duke Carlisle, led Texas to their first officially recognized national championship in 1963. Texas began that season averaging 35 points per game heading into the annual game with Oklahoma. The game against Oklahoma was the first meeting in the series where both teams were ranked No. 1 and No. 2 in the AP poll. Texas dominated the game from start to finish and beat the Sooners 28–7. There were no more threats to the team until the annual showdown with Texas A&M in College Station. On a rainy and murky afternoon both teams continued to turn the ball over in what was a close battle to the end. Texas would win 15–13, going on to post a perfect 11–0 record after a 28–6 victory over Navy in the Cotton Bowl Classic, which was another No. 1 vs No. 2 showdown during the season. Prior to the game, Pittsburgh sports writer Myron Cope said, "Tune in your television to the Cotton Bowl and you'll laugh yourself silly. Texas is the biggest fraud ever perpetrated on the football public." Royal was asked about Cope's comments moments before taking the field. Royal smiled, looked into the camera and said, "We're ready", and Texas went on to dominate the Navy team, solidifying their first official national championship. In November 1963, Royal announced that Texas was the first member of the Southwest Conference to integrate its intercollegiate athletic program. The following year was almost perfect; Texas was again ranked No. 1 during the 1964 season, only to lose by one point to arch-rival Arkansas in mid-October. Texas went 9–1 in the regular season and beat Joe Namath and No. 1 Alabama in the Orange Bowl, 21–17 with a famous last-second goal line stand, keeping Namath out of the endzone in the first televised bowl game at night. Duke Carlisle, who played both defensive back and quarterback, would finish his career with a 30–2–1 record as a starter. Royal's teams of the early 1960s went 40–3–1. The next three seasons posted a 19–12 win–loss record, but in 1968 Royal became the first coach to install the Wishbone formation in the backfield led by a group of players that became known as the "Worster Bunch" consisting of All-American's Steve Worster, James Street, Billy Dale, Chris Gilbert, and Cotton Speyrer. With this powerful new offense in place, the 1968 team went 9–1–1 with a demolishing 36–13 victory over Tennessee in the Cotton Bowl Classic, one of the most complete and lopsided wins in all statistics since the 1941 win over Oregon, 71–7. The 1968 Texas team would finish 3rd in the AP poll but were crowned National Champions by various polls which are recognized by the NCAA.

With the momentum carried over from the previous season, Texas began the 1969 season by defeating all opponents by an average score of 44 points. The final game of the regular season had No. 1 Texas against No. 2 Arkansas in the true "Game of the Century" for the 100th year of college football. The game saw Arkansas leading throughout the game when the Longhorns came from behind in the 4th quarter to win 15–14, capturing their second officially recognized national championship, in which President Richard Nixon declared Texas the champion after the game. Texas would then go on to face and defeat Notre Dame in the 1970 Cotton Bowl Classic which solidified Texas' place as the No. 1 team that year. This was also the Irish's first bowl game since 1924. Quarterback James Street would finish as the only Texas QB to win all games as a starter with a 20–0 perfect record. In 1970 Texas again was ranked No. 1 throughout the season. One of the most memorable games was against UCLA in Austin. With the Bruins leading 17–13 and less than 30 seconds left in the game, Texas quarterback Eddie Phillips hit receiver Cotton Speyrer over midfield and Speyrer sprinted untouched for the winning score 20–17 with only twelve seconds left in the game. Texas finished undefeated when they defeated Arkansas 42–7, capturing their third recognized national championship in 1970. The Longhorns' record from 1968 to 1970 was 30–2–1, which included winning 30 straight games. Texas was also in the hunt for national titles again in 1972. Royal described his team that year as "average as a day's wash" before the season began. Only a loss to Oklahoma kept the team from finishing unbeaten that season. During the final game against Alabama in the 1973 Cotton Bowl, Texas quarterback Alan Lowry ran the bootleg to perfection in a come from behind 17–13 win over the Crimson Tide. In 1975 Texas was in place to win the Southwest Conference crown outright but a loss to Texas A&M at the end of the season sent Texas to the Bluebonnet Bowl, a 38–21 victory over Colorado with a top-5 ranking. Royal's final game at Texas was against Arkansas in Austin at the end of the 1976 season; Texas won 29–12.

Royal is also credited for winning the Southwest Conference Title six years in a row from 1968 to 1973 along with six straight Cotton Bowl Classic appearances. He successfully revitalized the Texas football program in 1957 and put the team back to national prominence over the next 20 seasons. Over the course of his 20-year career, Royal never had a losing season, led the Longhorns to 3 national championships, 11 Southwest Conference titles, 16 bowl games, and 9 top-5 poll rankings, 15 top-25 poll rankings, 30 straight victories, 42 straight home victories in Austin from 1968 to 1976, and a record of 167–47–5, which makes Royal the most successful coach to coach at the University of Texas. After retiring from coaching football in 1976, Royal continued his role as athletic director until retiring in 1980. In 1996 the University of Texas officially honored him by renaming Texas Memorial Stadium to the Darrell K Royal–Texas Memorial Stadium, and he is considered to many Longhorn fans as the best coach in UT history.

=== Fred Akers era (1977–1986) ===
After Royal's retirement, he assumed that his long-time assistant coach Mike Campbell would take over as head coach, however the university had other plans. They picked a younger, former assistant coach of Royal's, Fred Akers who had experienced some success at Wyoming. With his new staff, Akers abandoned the wishbone offense and opted to rely solely on one running back with the implementation of the "I" formation, and some help from future Heisman Trophy winner Earl Campbell; Akers led the '77 Longhorns to a perfect 11–0 regular season record, and would have acquired UT's 4th recognized national championship if not for a loss to Notre Dame in the Cotton Bowl Classic. The 1977 Texas team has been recognized by various polls and the NCAA as the National Champion that year however the school does not claim this season as official. The following year Texas went 9–3 on the season including a 42–0 whipping of Maryland in the Sun Bowl. The 1979 season had high hopes for the Longhorn faithful as Texas was again in the hunt for a national championship with an AP poll ranking at No. 3. Only a loss to Texas A&M in the final game of the season kept Texas from playing Alabama in the Sugar Bowl that year. In 1980 members of the Southwest Conference decided to revise the game schedule and kicked off the new decade with Texas and Arkansas playing at the beginning of the season to commemorate a rivalry that was dominated by Texas. Texas again knocked off Arkansas 23–17 to start the new decade and once again reached the No. 1 spot in the AP poll for a period of three weeks before losing at home to SMU. Texas would stumble in the 1980 season due to several key injuries.

After a few winning seasons, Akers once again almost captured a national championship in 1981 by beating Alabama in the Cotton Bowl Classic, a remarkable 4th quarter comeback effort where Texas won 14–12 and landed his team at No. 2 in the final polls. The 1981 Texas team is recognized by the NCAA and various polls as the National Champion that year however the school does not claim this season as official. The 1982 season had high hopes for the Horns once again but 2 losses during the regular season kept Texas from playing for the title. A 33–7 victory over Arkansas in 1982 closed the season for Texas and they carried that momentum over the following year. In 1983 Akers had his Texas team on the hunt for a national championship that had eluded him twice before and led the Longhorn to an 11–0 season ranked No. 2 behind Nebraska the entire season. Texas went on to win the Southwest Conference again and faced Georgia in the Cotton Bowl Classic. Texas managed to hold a 9–3 led throughout the entire game despite entering Georgia's territory seven times. Only a muffed punt in the waning seconds of the game gave Georgia the momentum they would need to defeat Texas 10–9. Later that evening, Miami would go on to stun top-ranked Nebraska in the Orange Bowl 31–30 and win the 1983 national championship. Akers teams from 1981 to 1983 produced an incredible 30–5–1 record over three seasons. The 1984 season had Texas once again ranked No. 1 in the polls but soon dropped after a tie with Oklahoma and 3 straight losses to end the season. A year later Texas was once again ranked in the top ten but finished the season with a disappointing 8–4 record. During his career at Texas he was praised for his winning seasons but drew ire from the Longhorn faithful for not winning a national championship despite coming close on three occasions. From 1957 to 1985 Texas continued to have winning seasons. In 1986, Akers had his first losing season 5–6 due to many key injuries. And having two of the country's best running backs from high school being freshmen that year: Eric Metcalf, from Bishop Denis J. O'Connell High School in Arlington County, Virginia, and Andrew Jastal, from Santa Fe High School, Santa Fe, Texas. This was Texas' first losing season since 1956. After nine winning seasons, nine bowl games, two SWC titles and one Heisman trophy winner, Akers' tenure ended at the University of Texas with an 86–31–2 record, 3rd best in UT's history.

=== David McWilliams era (1987–1991) ===
After the exiting of Akers, Texas hired David McWilliams who was a former assistant coach at UT. McWilliams had just had his first promising year at Texas Tech before accepting the Texas head coaching position. With a solid 7–5 first season and a Bluebonnet Bowl victory over Pittsburgh in 1987, McWilliams initially reminded people of Darrel K. Royal. However, after two losing season of 4–7 in 1988 and 5–6 in 1989, the luster had worn off. But after an opening victory of Penn State in 1990 McWilliams began the "Shock the Nation" tour leading his team to 10–1, only losing to the eventual 1990 National Champions, Colorado. The 1990 Longhorns went to the 1991 Cotton Bowl Classic where they were defeated by Miami. Many Texas fans had hope of national championship in 1991, but were eventually disappointed when Texas finished with a 5–6 record which caused McWilliams to resign. At the end of his coaching career McWilliams led Texas to two bowl games, an SWC title, and a 31–26 record. The period of the late 1980s and early 1990s would be detrimental to all football programs in the Southwest Conference. At that time all schools (except Rice University) were under scrutiny by the NCAA as sanctions were imposed due to violations of NCAA regulations and recruiting rules, with Texas facing their third recruiting violation in the last 20 years. The school that would suffer the most from the infractions was the SMU football program as they were handed the "death penalty" from the NCAA in which there would be no team for two years and no games would be televised. The sanction handed to SMU would prove pivotal for other Southwest Conference schools as blue-chip recruits in the state of Texas would begin signing letters of intent to play in schools outside of the Southwest Conference and the state of Texas.

=== John Mackovic era (1992–1997) ===
The forcing out of David McWilliams allowed Texas to hire John Mackovic as head coach from Illinois. Having coached in the NFL for the Kansas City Chiefs and the Dallas Cowboys, Mackovic brought a fresh perspective to Texas. He had a great ability to recruit fresh talent, like future Heisman Trophy winner Ricky Williams. Mackovic also pushed to renovate the university's facilities, which offended some of his supporters. Mackovic was determined to rebuild the Longhorns from the ground up. In 1992 and 1993, the Horns went 6–5 (but were not bowl eligible due to one win over a D1-AA school), and 5–5–1 respectively. The Longhorns began to see some hope in 1994, when they finished the regular season 7–4 and shared the SWC title. Texas also won its first bowl game in 7 years at the Sun Bowl in a come-from-behind victory against North Carolina. In 1995, the Horns went 10–1–1 under Mackovic, won the final SWC title outright and earned a bid to the Sugar Bowl against Virginia Tech.

The 1995 season was the final year of the Southwest Conference due to the sanctions that had been imposed after various infractions and recruiting violations as all schools withdrew from the conference and joined other established conferences. Throughout the 80-year history of the conference, Texas was the most dominant football program in its history, winning 27 conference championships and representing the champion in the Cotton Bowl Classic a record 22 times. 1996 brought about the formation of the new Big 12 Conference and new talks about Texas winning a national championship. But after going 4–3, the Horns struggled just to stay bowl eligible. Texas then rallied, winning 5 straight games which would earn them the Big 12 South Crown. The first season of the Big 12 included an upset victory in the inaugural Big 12 Championship Game over then two-time defending National Champion, Nebraska where the famous fourth and inches call "roll left" occurred as Texas quarterback James Brown rolled to his left and passed to Derek Lewis for 61 yards as Texas won 37–27. The game was considered the most stunning upset college football game of the 1990s. Texas earned the automatic bid to the Fiesta Bowl where they faced Penn State. The close of the 1996 season and the five straight wins propelled by a high powered offense led by James Brown gave Texas fans high hopes for the 1997 season. In the opener, Texas defeated Rutgers but lost starting quarterback James Brown to an ankle injury. The following week Texas faced UCLA, their first meeting since a 28–10 win for Texas in 1971. After an embarrassing 66–3 loss to UCLA, Texas went into a downward spiral and never fully recovered. The team finished the 1997 season at 4–7, their worst record in over 50 years. After the season, head coach John Mackovic was reassigned within the athletic department, leaving his UT coaching record at 41–28–2.

=== Mack Brown era (1998–2013) ===
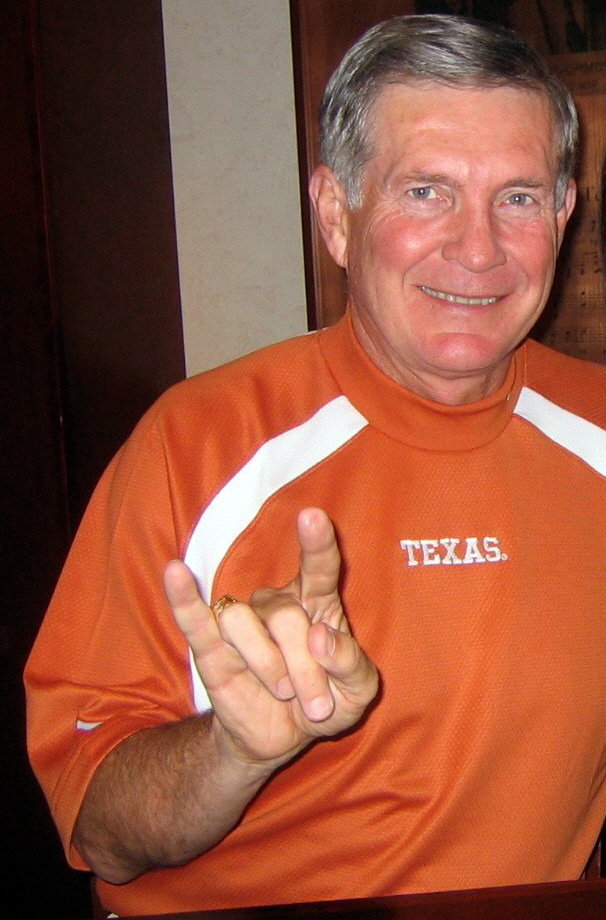
Coach Brown

The Longhorns started 1998 with a new head coach, Mack Brown, who came to Texas after serving as head football coach at North Carolina. Immediately after being hired on Brown would begin the rebuilding process by conducting a speaking tour through many Texas high schools in order to turn around the relationship with coaches and schools that had previously been blocked out by previous head coaches. His ideas and ability to recruit would prove pivotal to the first several years in his position. The Mack Brown era officially debuted with a 66–36 win over New Mexico State in Austin in which running back Ricky Williams would account for six rushing touchdowns. Texas was able to build on that momentum winning six straight including an upset win over Nebraska, 20–16, in Lincoln, Nebraska; which snapped the Cornhuskers streak of 48 straight home victories. The team would go undefeated at home that season and close out a thrilling 26–24 last minute upset win over #6 rival Texas A&M, Texas went on to face and dominate Mississippi State in the 1999 Cotton Bowl Classic, their first New Years Bowl victory since 1981. After a great start in 1998, the talk of national championships began in 1999. However, the talk quickly died after a rocky start, but Texas rebounded with a huge third straight victory over No. 3 Nebraska in Austin and finished the season 9–5. The 2000 season had many people speaking of a championship run with the loaded talent recruited from the previous year. There were growing pains during the season as Texas finished 2nd in the Big 12 and 9–3 overall. In 2001, Texas went 10–1 on the season and was heading towards a national championship appearance against Miami but were upset in the Big 12 championship by Colorado, who they had previously beaten soundly in the regular season. Texas finished the year with an exciting shoot-out win in the Holiday Bowl over Washington where Major Applewhite would set a passing record of 473 yards in a come from behind 47–43 victory. The Holiday Bowl would be voted as the most watched bowl game of the 2001 season. Applewhite finished his career with a 22–6 record as a starting quarterback. Texas would finish the season 11–2 ranked in the top five. In 2002, Texas was again ranked in the top 5 of the polls with hopes of another championship run. Two conference losses set Texas back in the polls where they finished 11–2, beat LSU in the Cotton Bowl, and finished in the top five.

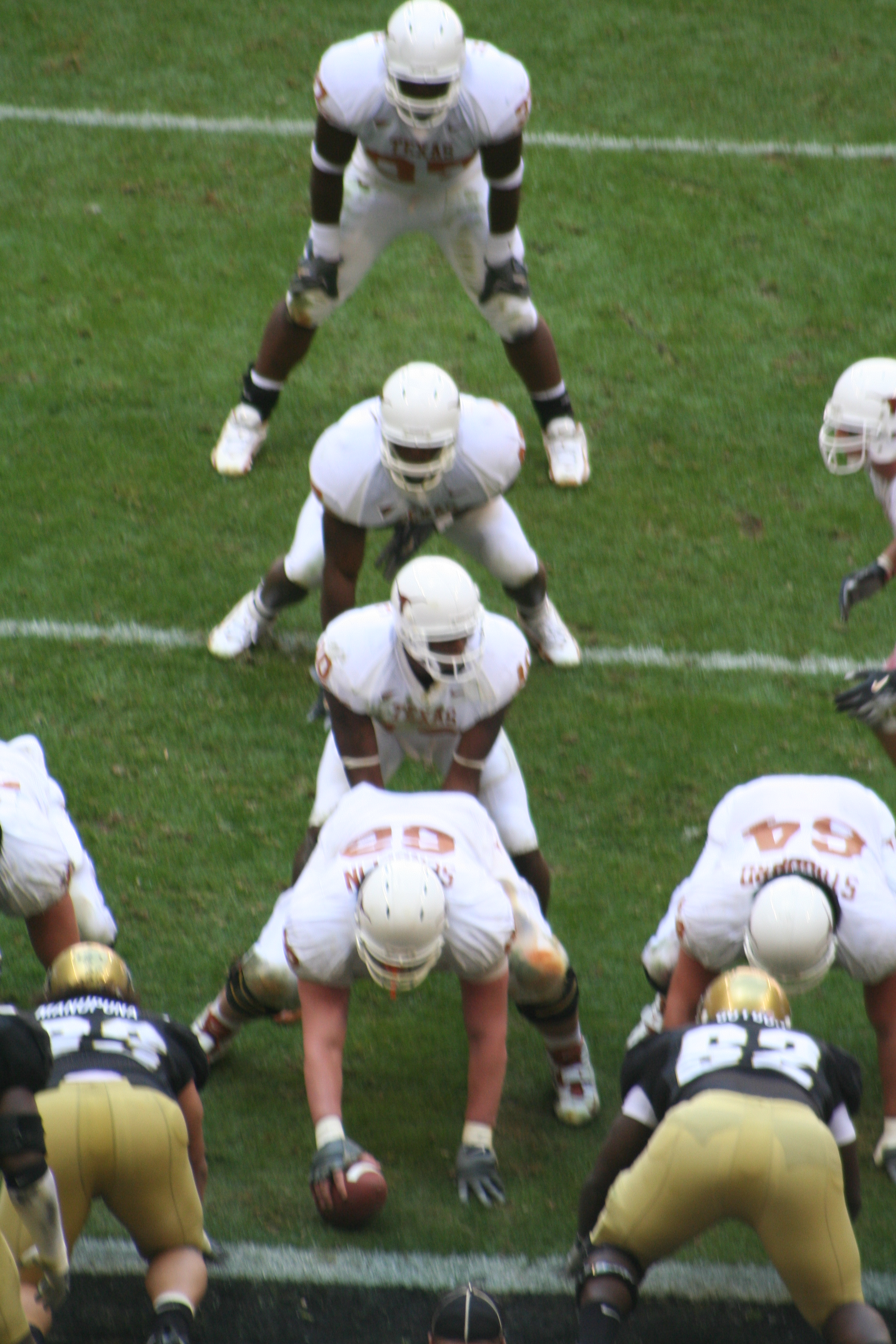
The 2005 Texas Longhorns in the "I formation" against Colorado in the 2005 Big 12 Championship Game

After the 2003 season, Brown had a 59–18 (77%) win–loss record but had not managed to win the Big 12 conference or to lead the Longhorns to a Bowl Championship Series game. He was often lauded for his recruiting while being criticized for failing to win the big games and most importantly, championships. Texas would finish the 2003 season with a 10–3 record again finishing 2nd in the Big 12 conference. The 2004 Texas Longhorns football team became that first championship team for Mack Brown by going 10–1 and playing in their first BCS Game, in a rare move, broke up the Rose Bowl's tradition of Pac-10 vs Big 10. The 2005 Rose Bowl, Texas faced the Wolverines of the University of Michigan the first meeting between the two teams. For sixty minutes, Texas quarterback Vince Young broke down Michigan's defense. The Longhorns defeated the Wolverines 38–37 on a successful 37-yard field goal by place kicker Dusty Mangum as time expired. It was the first time the Rose Bowl had ever been decided on the closing play. The Rose Bowl victory earned the 11–1 Longhorns a top 5 finish in the polls for the season. With the Rose Bowl victory, Texas became only the fourth school in NCAA history to have won all four original New Year's Day bowl games (Rose, Sugar, Orange, and Cotton Bowls). The 2005 Texas Longhorns football team was given a pre-season No. 2 ranking (behind defending National Champions University of Southern California) which they maintained throughout the entire 2005 regular season. Texas was tested early against No. 4 ranked Ohio State in Columbus, Ohio which was also the very first meeting between the two historical football programs. Prior to the game Buckeye linebacker, Bobby Carpenter, was quoted saying "our goal is to make sure that Vince Young is no longer a Heisman candidate after he leaves here." The No. 2 Longhorns went on to defeat Ohio State 25–22 at the Horseshoe in at Columbus, Ohio when Young threw a TD pass to Limas Sweed and then Aaron Harris got a game-winning safety. However, throughout the remainder of the season, Texas dominated every team they faced including a 45–12 victory over Oklahoma which ended the five-year losing streak to their arch-rival. The 12–0, undefeated No. 2 Texas would face No. 1 undefeated USC in the BCS National Championship at the Rose Bowl. During the month of preparation for the BCS National Championship Game, ESPN ran a series of 11 specials listing the 2005 USC Trojans second among the greatest college football teams of all time, while the 2005 Texas Longhorns were never listed nor mentioned. Texas won 41–38 in the final 20 seconds of regulation by a Vince Young rushing touchdown on 4th down and 5, giving the Longhorns a perfect 13–0 season and an undisputed national championship. Vince Young had beaten USC, Matt Leinart (2004 Heisman Trophy winner) and Reggie Bush (2005 Heisman Trophy winner) and would finish his career with a 30–2 record as a starter, the best of any Texas quarterback at the time.

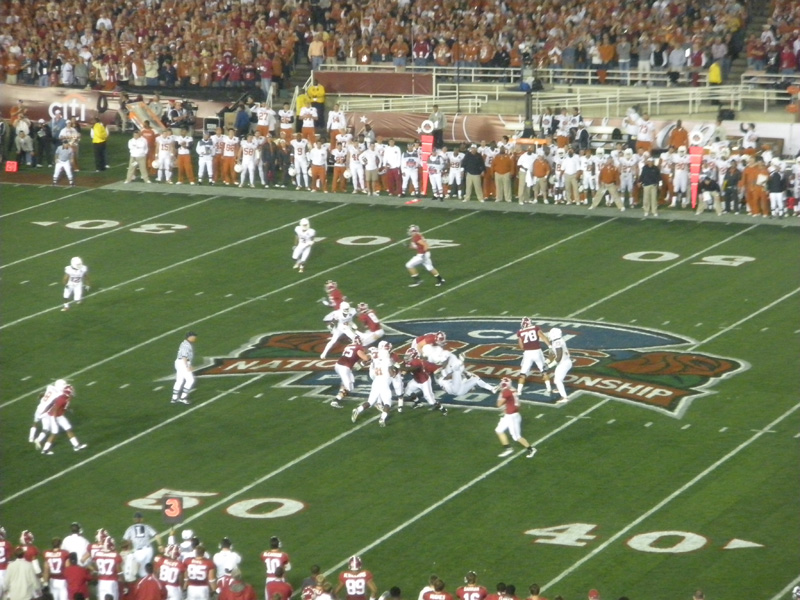
50-yard line action at the BCS National Championship Game on January 7, 2010

The 2006 Texas Longhorns football team hoped to repeat as national champions even though quarterback Vince Young elected to go to the NFL early which left freshman Colt McCoy as the starting quarterback. After an early loss to Ohio State, the Longhorns with McCoy at the helm went into November undefeated in Big 12 play. But in a game against Kansas State, McCoy suffered a neck injury on a quarterback sneak which led to a 45–42 Texas loss. This was followed by a 12–7 upset loss against Texas A&M, when McCoy was again knocked out of the game. As a result of these losses, the Longhorns played in the Alamo Bowl and defeated Iowa, 26–24, ending the 2006 season with a 10–3 record. Texas entered the 2007 season ranked in the top 10 but then suffered back-to-back losses to Kansas State (41–21) and Oklahoma (28–21). Texas surged back by winning the next five games in a row and appeared to be poised to gain a BCS bowl berth; however, a 38–30 loss to Texas A&M dashed those hopes. The 2007 Longhorns finished the season 10–3 with a victory over Arizona State, 52–34, in the 2007 Holiday Bowl. The Longhorns had problems off the field that culminated in the 2007 Texas Longhorns football suspensions.

The 2008 Texas Longhorns started the season ranked eleventh nationally but moved to fifth and then first after beating Oklahoma. They retained their No. 1 status by beating top-ranked No. 11 Missouri and No. 7 Oklahoma State, until the Longhorns lost to No. 6 undefeated Texas Tech on a last-second, game-winning pass from Graham Harrell to Michael Crabtree. A later loss by the Texas Tech Red Raiders to the Oklahoma Sooners caused a three-way tie in the Big 12 South, between Texas, Tech, and OU each with only one loss to each other. The Big 12 tiebreaker would be decided by who was ranked highest in the final BCS standings. When released and the Sooners were ahead of the Longhorns by .0128 points, sending the Sooners to the Big 12 Championship Game and eventually the BCS National Championship Game, and the Longhorns to the Fiesta Bowl. At the conclusion of the regular season, Colt McCoy was one of the three finalists for the Heisman Trophy along with Tim Tebow and Sam Bradford, who won the 2008 trophy. On January 5, 2009, the 3rd-ranked University of Texas defeated 10th-ranked Ohio State, 24–21, in the Fiesta Bowl in the third meeting between the two schools. With under a minute to play, Texas WR Quan Cosby caught the game-winning touchdown, ending the Longhorns' season with a 12–1 record at No. 3 in the AP Poll. The 2009 Texas team went undefeated (13–0) in the regular season and played Nebraska in the Big 12 Championship Game which was "a defensive battle fought to the bitter end" as Kirk Herbstreit described it. Texas won 13–12 by a last-second Hunter Lawrence field goal, becoming the 2009 Big 12 Champions. The No. 2 Longhorns later faced No. 1 Alabama in the 2010 BCS National Championship Game. Beginning with the sixth play of the first drive for Texas, true freshman quarterback Garrett Gilbert would play due to an early shoulder injury to Heisman-nominated starting quarterback Colt McCoy. Gilbert brought the team within 3 points in the fourth quarter; however Texas lost the game, 37–21. McCoy was not only the most successful quarterback of Mack Brown's tenure, but also the most successful quarterback in NCAA history with 45–8 record as a starter.

In 2010, after losing six players to the NFL draft, the Texas Longhorns suffered their worst season under Mack Brown, going 5–7 and finishing last in the Big 12 South. Texas started the season at 3–0 before losing at home to UCLA. Texas never recovered during the early season loss and finished last in the conference for the first time since 1956. The 2010 season was a pivotal point in the Brown era where the string of nine 10 or more win seasons came to an end. The only signature win of the season was a 20–13 upset in Lincoln over No. 5 Nebraska in their final in-conference match-up. The 2011 offseason saw a change-up in several assistant coaching positions. Bryan Harsin, known for his creative trickery with offenses was hired as the new offensive coordinator while Manny Diaz was hired to run the defensive. Texas began the season at 4–0 highlighted by a come from behind victory, 17–16, over BYU and a dismantling win over UCLA, 49–20, in the Rose Bowl. Texas then lost to both Oklahoma and Oklahoma State but rebounded with wins over Kansas and Texas Tech. After two close losses to Kansas State and Missouri, Texas went into College Station for the final meeting against rival Texas A&M. The Aggies led throughout the game but were unable to put away Texas as Case McCoy scrambled for 42 yards to set up a last second field goal win for Texas, 27–25. After a 7–5 season Texas was selected to play California in the 2011 Holiday Bowl in San Diego, the Longhorns 50th bowl appearance in its storied program history. After a slow start David Ash guided the offense to three touchdowns along with a swarming defense that forced five California turnovers. Texas won 21–10 and finished the 2011 season at 8–5 overall.

The 2012 season was, to some, a disappointing season for the Longhorns. The Team started off the year with four straight victories over the Wyoming Cowboys, New Mexico Lobos, Ole Miss Rebels, and Oklahoma State Cowboys. However, Texas lost to the #8 West Virginia Mountaineers and a lopsided 63–21 loss to the #13 Oklahoma Sooners. Texas rebounded with four straight victories over Baylor, Kansas, #20 Texas Tech, and Iowa State. Texas lost their last two games of the regular season to TCU and #7 Kansas State to finish the regular season #23 with an 8–4 Record. Texas then defeated Oregon State 31–27 to win the 2012 Alamo Bowl. The game was iced for Texas when David Ash hit Marquise Goodwin for a Game-Winning Touchdown and when Alex Okafor made a Game-Winning Sack. The Longhorns went 8–5 in 2013. Defensive coordinator Manny Diaz was fired following a week two BYU defeat in which Texas' defense allowed a school record 550 rushing yards. Texas lost again the following week against Ole Miss but went on to win six in a row, including a surprise win over Oklahoma and an overtime victory over West Virginia. Texas lost Oklahoma State 38–13, beat Texas Tech 41–16, and lost to Baylor 30–10 in what turned out to be a de facto conference championship following Oklahoma State's loss to Oklahoma. Quarterback David Ash missed most of the season with lingering concussion symptoms, so Case McCoy started under center for most of the year. Following a week full of speculation about his future with Texas, Mack Brown announced his retirement on December 14, 2013, following their Valero Alamo Bowl appearance versus Oregon. From 1998 to 2013 Texas posted a 158–48 record under Brown, 2 Big 12 conference championships, 1 national championship, and a 3–1 record in BCS Bowl games. Brown finished his career at Texas as the second winningest coach in school history.

=== Charlie Strong era (2014–2016) ===
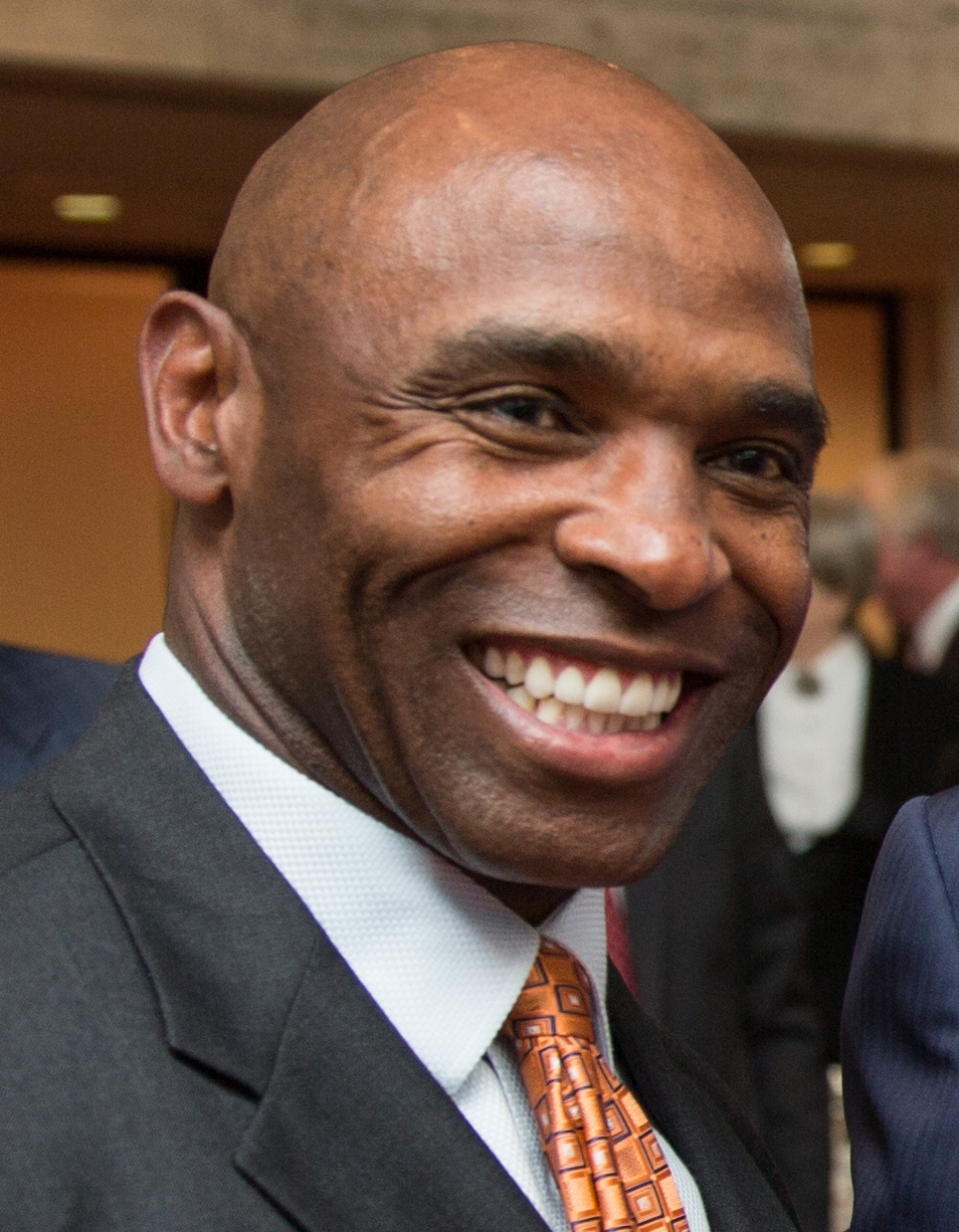
Coach Strong

On January 5, 2014, it was announced that Louisville head coach Charlie Strong would become the 29th head football coach of the Longhorns. Strong is the first African American head coach in Longhorn football history. During the offseason after Strong was hired, it was announced that nine different players would be released from the program for various reasons including violations of team rules and policies.

Texas under Strong finished 6–7 in 2014. The "Stronghorns" era began with a 38–7 stuffing of North Texas. Following the North Texas win, David Ash would suffer another concussion, leaving sophomore Tyrone Swoopes to run quarterback. In a rematch of last season against BYU, the Horns put up defensive battle but couldn't avoid a 2nd half collapse, lost 41–7. The following week, Texas would hold a 17–13 lead over #12 UCLA only to lose on a late touchdown pass 20–17. During their bye week, Strong announced Ash's retirement from football after a year-long battle with concussions. An improved Swoopes would lead the 'Horns to their first shutout under Strong, 23–0 against Kansas. The following week Texas put up a strong defensive battle against #7 Baylor at home. Despite keeping the nation's best offense in check with a 7–0 deficit at halftime, they would lose 28–7. The Red River Shootout against Oklahoma in Dallas the following week showed many signs of improvement. Texas led Oklahoma in every single statistical category (including penalties) but the final score. An interception return for a touchdown and a kickoff return for a touchdown proved to be the advantage for the Sooners as Texas lost a close 31–26 game at the Cotton Bowl. The next week, Texas won a 48–45 shootout in Austin against Iowa State after Swoopes threw two clutch passes to Jaxon Shipley and John Harris to set up Nick Rose for the game-winning FG. Kansas State shut down the offense, 23–0, the first time Texas was shut out in ten years. Sitting at 3–5, hope was almost lost for a bowl game. However, Texas rebounded with 3 straight wins over Texas Tech, Oklahoma State and stunning #23 West Virginia. The Horns were then defeated by #5 TCU on Thanksgiving, 48–10, ending the season at 6–6. Texas was then invited to play former Southwest Conference rival Arkansas at the Texas Bowl in Houston. Arkansas defeated Texas 31–7 to end the 2014 season at 6–7.

In 2015, inconsistency plagued the Longhorns throughout the season. The season started on the road with a loss to Notre Dame and last second losses to California and Oklahoma State. Texas was able to overcome these losses and beat number 10 ranked Oklahoma, 24–17, in Dallas but then suffered key losses to Iowa State and Texas Tech. The final game of the season was against number 12 ranked Baylor in Waco. Texas was able to pull off the upset 23–17 over the Bears closing the season on a high-note. Texas eventually finished the season at 5–7 and would not qualify for a bowl game. The 2016 season opened at home against #10 ranked Notre Dame which Texas would win in double overtime, 50–47. The season opener against the Irish set the all-time record in attendance at Darrell K. Royal Memorial Stadium at 102,315. The opening win gave fans hope of a turnaround season with victories over #8 Baylor but losses to Oklahoma and TCU would ultimately lead to a dismal 5–7 record finish and Texas would not qualify for a bowl game. After three years as the Texas head coach, Charlie Strong was fired on November 26, 2016.

=== Tom Herman era (2017–2020) ===
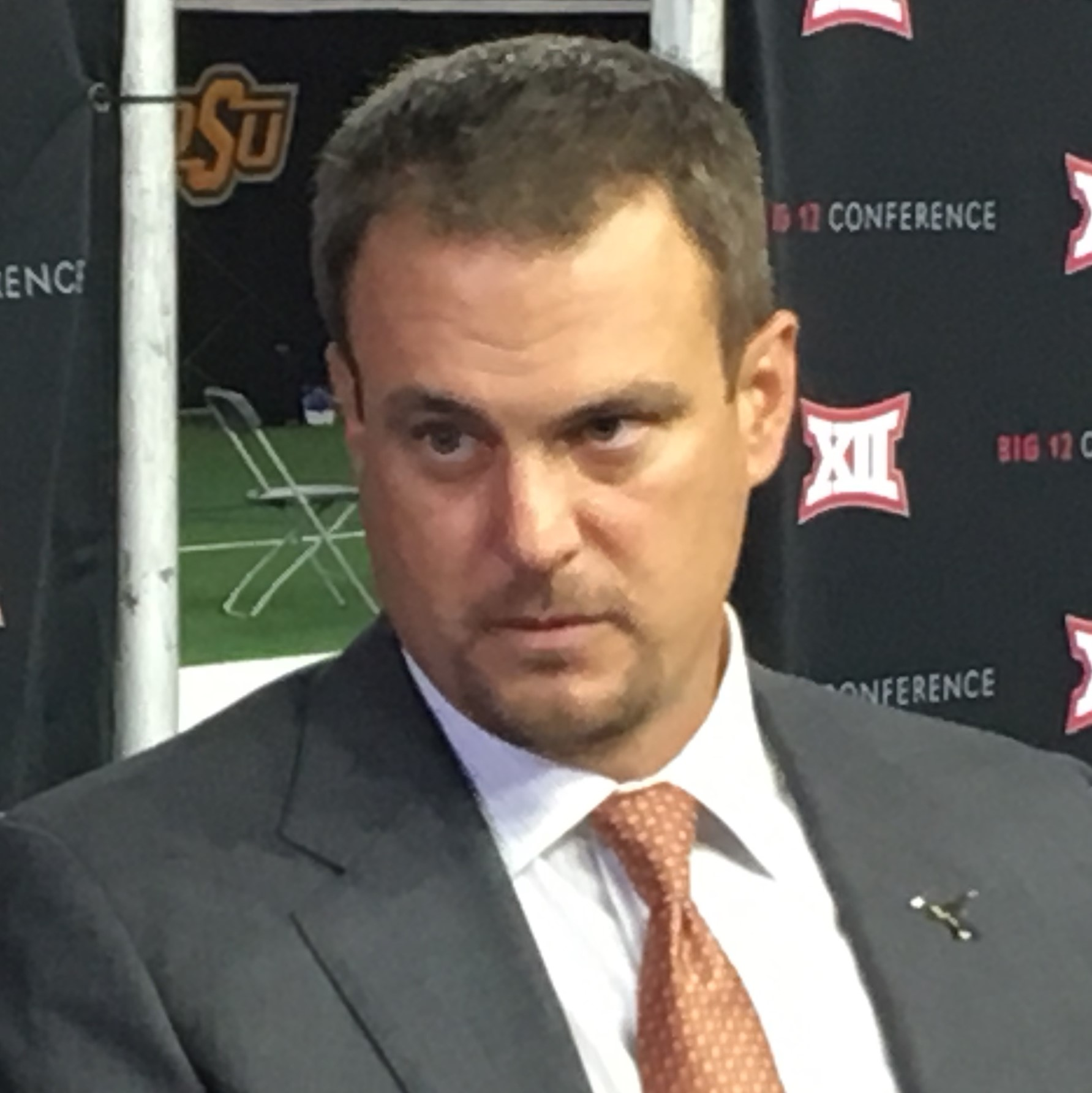
Coach Herman at a press conference in 2017

On November 27, 2016, Houston head coach Tom Herman was hired as the Longhorns head coach, replacing Strong. The 2017 season opened with a home loss to Maryland, but Texas would eventually finish the regular season at 6–6 and qualify for their first bowl game in two seasons against Missouri in the Texas Bowl. Texas won 33–16 and finish with their first winning record in three years at 7–6.

The Longhorns began the 2019 season ranked 10th in the nation, with quarterback Sam Ehlinger named the best quarterback in the Big 12 by the Dallas Morning News. After suffering losses to #6 LSU, #6 Oklahoma, and TCU, Texas dropped out of the rankings, and ended up finishing 3rd in the Big 12. They upset the 10th-ranked Utah Utes by a convincing 38–10 margin in the Alamo Bowl. The 2020 season was abbreviated due to the COVID-19 pandemic, with all out-of-conference games being cancelled, as well as the game against Kansas. The Longhorns finished 7–3, winning their second straight Alamo Bowl in Ehlinger's last game at Texas. On January 2, 2021, after initially saying Herman would return as head coach for the 2021 season, Texas fired Herman.

=== Steve Sarkisian era (2021–present) ===
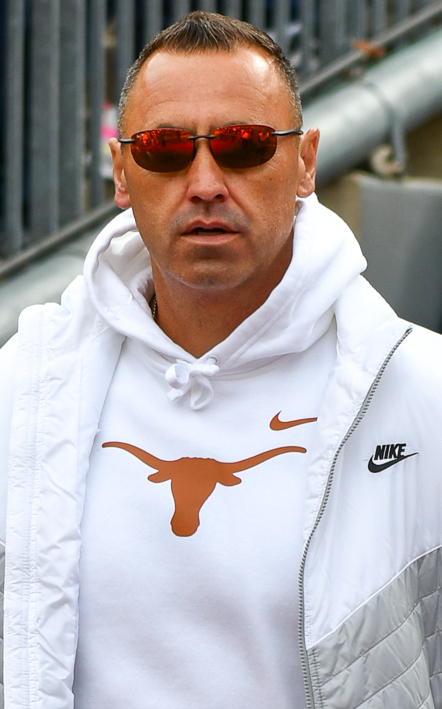
Coach Sarkisian in 2024

The same day Herman was fired, Texas announced then-Alabama offensive coordinator and former Washington and USC head coach Steve Sarkisian as their next head coach. Sarkisian arrived in Austin after directing explosive offenses during his tenure at Alabama and after winning the 2020 Broyles Award as the nation's top assistant coach. Sarkisian signed a six-year contract with UT worth $34.2 million excluding incentives.

The Longhorns' 2021 season, the first under Sarkisian, began with a win over #23 Louisiana, led by redshirt freshman Hudson Card, who won the starting quarterback job over junior Casey Thompson. After Card struggled the following week against Arkansas, Thompson took over as starter. A loss against Oklahoma began a six-game losing streak, the Longhorns' longest since 1956. Texas finished the season 5–7, failing to qualify for a bowl game for the first time since 2015.

The following 2022 season, Quinn Ewers, the country's top quarterback recruit in 2021, transferred to Texas from Ohio State. Ewers was injured during a close loss to Alabama in week 2, and missed the next three games before returning in a historic 49–0 blowout of the Oklahoma Sooners in the 2022 Red River Shootout, which was the most lopsided shutout in the history of the rivalry. Texas finished the season 8–5 with a loss to the Washington Huskies in the Alamo Bowl.

In 2023, the Longhorns finished their regular season 11–1, their best record since the 2009 season, and were victorious in their final Big 12 Championship appearance, beating Oklahoma State 49–21. They received the 3rd seed in the 2023-24 College Football Playoff, Texas' first playoff appearance, and were defeated 31–37 by the Washington Huskies in a rematch of previous season's Alamo Bowl.

In 2024 Texas moved from the Big 12 to the SEC along with their long-time rivals, the Oklahoma Sooners, which also restarted the long-time rivalry against Texas A&M Aggys. Late into the season, with a 10–1 record, the Longhorns faced off against the Aggys for a spot in the SEC championship, with Texas scoring a 17–7 win. This win secured their spot in the SEC championship game, playing against Georgia who won 22-19. Sarkisian led the Longhorns to a win in their debut of the College Football Playoff 12-team format with their first ever matchup against the Clemson Tigers in a 38–24 victory. On January 1, 2025, he led the team to the Peach Bowl against the Arizona State Sun Devils in a double overtime matchup with the Longhorns defense sealing the win with an interception and a 39–31 final score and earning them their first 13 win season since 2009. Nine days later, the Longhorns season came to an end after a loss to the Ohio State Buckeyes in the Cotton Bowl Classic with a 14–28 final score. The team's final record ending at 13–3, which tied 2005 and 2009 for wins.

The 2025 team opened the season as the consensus number one team in the country, the first time in Longhorn's history. In their first game they were defeated by the Ohio State Buckeyes 7–14, a rematch of the final game of Texas' 2024 season. In the SEC opener at Florida, Texas was upset by a 1–3 Gators team by a score of 21–29. The following week, an unranked Texas upset sixth ranked Oklahoma in Dallas, before rattling off three more wins. With a 7–2 record and a trip to the playoff likely depending on a good showing against #5 Georgia, the Longhorns were demolished 10–35. The team recovered with a 52–37 victory over rival Arkansas and 27–17 victory over an undefeated Texas A&M. The season ended with a 41–27 victory over Michigan in the Citrus Bowl and a 10–3 overall record, their worst since 2022.
