= Vliet =

Vliet is a Dutch term for a minor streaming water and may refer to:

- Vliet (canal), a canal in South Holland, the Netherlands
- Vliet, Utrecht, a hamlet in Utrecht, the Netherlands
- Vliets, Kansas, a community in the United States

== See also ==
- Asopos de Vliet, a rowing club at Leiden University
- Hanna van Vliet, a Dutch actress
- Steenbergse Vliet, a canal in North Brabant, the Netherlands
- Van Vliet, a common Dutch surname
- Van der Vliet, a Dutch surname
