= Louisa Van Vleet Spicer Wright =

American physician

Louisa "Lutie" Van Vleet Spicer Wright (1862–1913) was the first doctor in Clark County, Washington to have both a degree in medicine and a license to practice medicine having obtained both upon graduating from what was then the University of Michigan Medical School at Ann Arbor, Michigan in 1885.

== Early life ==
She was born in Fern Prairie, Washington in 1862. After finishing school, she taught in schools in Grass Valley, earning $25 per month and saving up for medical school.

She went to the University of Oregon Medical College, and eventually transferred to what was then the University of Michigan Medical School at Ann Arbor, Michigan. She graduated in 1885, at age 23.

== Career ==
After finishing medical school, she spent some time practicing medicine in Missoula, Montana, then returned to Washington. She was the only doctor in the area, and delivered many babies in and around Camas.

== Personal life ==
In 1890, Wright purchased 10 acres of the Parkersville property from her parents, and then an additional 35 acres in 1904. Her son Cecil Van Vleet inherited the 10 acres at Parkersville, then sold it to the Port of Camas-Washougal in 1977.

She was married to J.W. Wright and had two daughters, Louise Spicer and Edith Spicer. She died in 1913 at age 50, after being kicked in the jaw by a horse while harnessing it. She was buried at Fern Prairie Cemetery.
