= Van Vliet =

Van Vliet is a toponymic surname of Dutch origin. The original bearer may have lived or worked near a vliet, a Dutch term for a minor stream. The name is quite common in the Netherlands, ranking 40th in 2007 (16,903 people). Variations include Van de Vliet and Van der Vliet. People with this surname include:

- Albertine van Vliet-Kuiper (born 1951), Dutch mayor
- Andy Van Vliet (born 1995), Belgian basketball player
- Arie van Vliet (1916–2001), Dutch Olympic cycler
- Carolyne Van Vliet (1929–2016), Dutch-born American physicist
- Claire Van Vliet (born 1933), Canadian painter, illustrator and typographer
- Chris Van Vliet (born 1983), Canadian television personality
- Don Van Vliet (1941–2010), better known as Captain Beefheart, American musician and painter
- Eddy van Vliet (1942–2002), Belgian writer and lawyer
- Hanna van Vliet (born 1992), Dutch actress
- Hanpeter van Vliet (1962–1996), Dutch software engineer
- Hans van Vliet (born 1949), Dutch computer scientist
- Hans van Vliet (born 1976), better known as Hunz, Australian electronic pop musician
- Hendrick Cornelisz van Vliet (1611–1675), Dutch painter
- Jan van Vliet (1622–1666), Dutch philologist
- Jan Gillisz van Vliet (1605–1668), Dutch painter
- Jeremias van Vliet (1602–1663), Dutch East India Company director and historian in Thailand
- Jeroen van Vliet (born 1965), Dutch jazz pianist
- John H. Van Vliet (1914–2000), United States Army commander and POW known for the Van Vliet Report
- Krystyn Van Vliet, American engineer
- Leo van Vliet (born 1955), Dutch racing cyclist
- Louis van Vliet (1854–1932), Dutch chess master
- Lyman Van Vliet (born ca. 1927), American inventor of Shoe Goo
- Marcel van Vliet (born 1970), Dutch truck racer
- Marjorie van Vliet (1923–1990), American aviator
- Maury Van Vliet (1913–2001), Canadian physical education academic
- Nel van Vliet (1926–2006), Dutch swimmer
- Paul van Vliet (1935–2023), Dutch cabaretier and UNICEF Goodwill Ambassador
- Perry Van Vliet Hackett (born 1943), American television journalist
- Peter Van Vliet (fl. 1841–1851), American farmer and politician
- Robert Campbell Van Vliet (1857–1943), United States Army commander
- Roland van Vliet (born 1969), Dutch politician
- Stefanie van Vliet (born 1967), Dutch politician
- Stewart Van Vliet (1815–1901), Union general of the American Civil War
- Teun van Vliet (born 1962), Dutch road cyclist
- Tony Van Vliet (American politician) (born 1930), American politician
- Tony Van Vliet (Australian politician) (1933–1982), Australian politician
- Willem van Vliet (born 1952), Dutch sociologist

Van de(r) Vliet

- Albert Van de Vliet (born 1917, date of death unknown), Belgian Olympic canoeist
- Cornelis van der Vliet (1880–1960), Dutch sports shooter
- Henk van der Vliet (born 1928), Dutch flutist and composer
- Jan van der Vliet (born 1949), Dutch rower
- Patricia van der Vliet (born 1989), Dutch fashion model
- Wiebe van der Vliet (born 1970), Dutch film editor
- Willem van der Vliet (ca. 1584–1642), Dutch Golden Age painter
- Fan-der-Flit, Russian noble merchant family

== See also ==
- Vliet (disambiguation)
