= Samuel Huston Thompson =

American lawyer and football coach (1875–1966)

- Huston, 1923

Biographical details
- Born: November 1, 1875; Lewisburg, Pennsylvania, U.S.
- Died: February 17, 1966 (aged 90); Washington, D.C., U.S.

Coaching career (HC unless noted)
- 1897: Oberlin
- 1898–1899: Lehigh
- 1900–1901: Texas

Head coaching record
- Overall: 24–18–3

Samuel Huston "Shy" Thompson Jr. (November 1, 1875 – February 17, 1966) was an American lawyer and college football coach. The Princeton University graduate served as head football coach at Oberlin College in 1897, at Lehigh University from 1898 to 1899, and at the University of Texas at Austin from 1900 to 1901, compiling a career college football record of 24–18–3. He was the first head coach at Texas to return for a second season. Thompson served as assistant U.S. attorney general under President Woodrow Wilson from 1913 to 1918 and on the Federal Trade Commission (FTC) from 1919 to 1927. He was the chair of the FTC from December 1, 1920 to November 30, 1921, and again from December 1, 1923 to November 30, 1924.

== Early life and education ==
Born in Lewisburg, Pennsylvania, Thompson attended Lawrenceville School and Princeton University, from which he graduated in 1897. He played on the Princeton football team for all four years of his time at that institution.

== Coaching career ==
Thompson was the seventh head football coach at Lehigh University in Bethlehem, Pennsylvania and he held that position for two seasons, from 1898 until 1899. His record at Lehigh was 5–15–1. Highlights of his two seasons included back-to-back victories over rival Rutgers.

== Political and legal career ==
Following his coaching years, Thompson attended New York Law School, and from 1903 to 1906 lectured at the University of Denver College of Law. After managing the western campaign for the presidency for Woodrow Wilson, Thompson moved to Washington, D.C., in 1913 and served as an assistant attorney general in Wilson's administration. Thompson was appointed to the Federal Trade Commission by Wilson, and reappointed by Warren G. Harding. He remained in that office during the presidencies of Calvin Coolidge and Herbert Hoover, during which he served for several stints as FTC chair.

In 1923, following the death of Colorado senator Samuel D. Nicholson, former president Wilson lobbied governor William Ellery Sweet to appoint Thompson to the seat, "only to meet with a cold turndown". In 1927, food safety advocate Harvey Washington Wiley advocated for Thompson to run for President of the United States, describing Thompson as "devoted solely to the public welfare" and asserting that he "would not use his power as president in any way to protect any vested interest against what was best for the public at large". Thompson later served as a special counsel to President Franklin D. Roosevelt.

Thompson died in his home in Washington, D.C., following a heart attack at the age of 90. He was interred in Georgetown.

== Head coaching record ==
Year	Team	Overall	Conference	Standing	Bowl/playoffs
Oberlin Yeomen (Independent) (1897)
1897	Oberlin	5–1–1			
Oberlin:		5–1–1			
Lehigh (Independent) (1898–1899)
1898	Lehigh	3–6–1			
1899	Lehigh	2–9			
Lehigh:		5–15–1			
Texas Longhorns (Southern Intercollegiate Athletic Association) (1900–1901)
1900	Texas	6–0	1–0	5th	
1901	Texas	8–2–1	0–0–1	7th	
Texas:		14–2–1	1–0–1		
Total:		24–18–3			

Political offices
Preceded by Victor Murdock; Victor Murdock	Chairmen of the Federal Trade Commission; 1920–1921; 1923–1924	Succeeded by Nelson B. Gaskill; Vernon W. Van Fleet
