= Vernon W. Van Fleet =

Federal Trade Commission chair (c. 1866–1932)

Vernon W. Van Fleet (c. 1866 – February 19, 1932) was the chair of the Federal Trade Commission from December 1, 1924, to November 30, 1925.

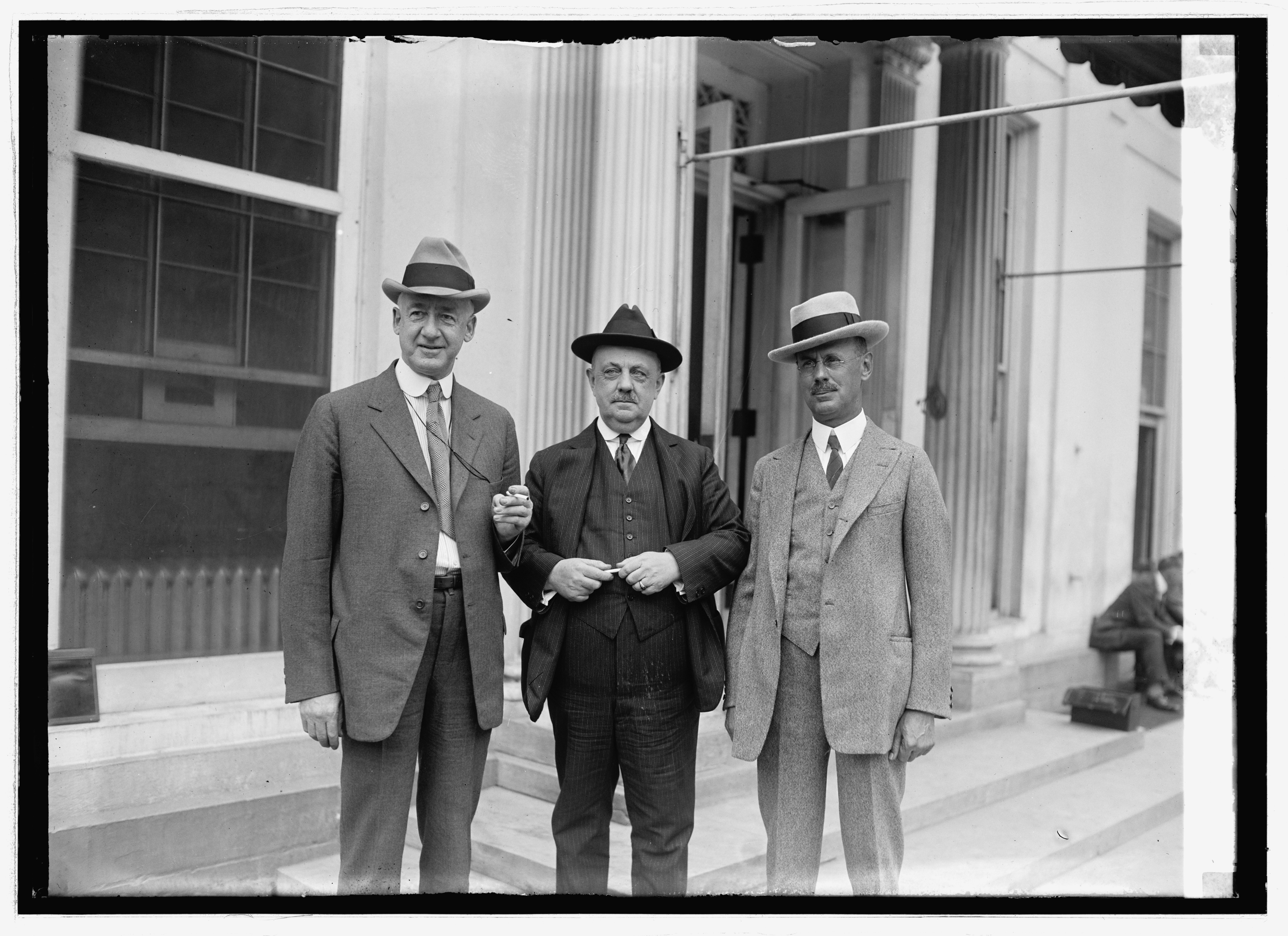

Prior to his selection to the FTC in 1922, Van Fleet had been a judge of the Superior Court of Indiana for eight years. Van Fleet had moved to Washington, D.C., in 1921 to serve as a special assistant to the attorney general. As a member of the FTC, he "dissented publicly from FTC orders more than any other Commissioner", and resigned in 1926, before the expiration of his term.

Van Fleet died in his home at the age of 66, following a brief illness.

Political offices
Preceded by Samuel Huston Thompson	Chairmen of the Federal Trade Commission; 1924–1925	Succeeded by John F. Nugent
