= Willem van Vliet =

Willem James van Vliet (born 12 April 1949) was educated at a Queen's University in the Netherlands, graduating in 1970 with an award from the French embassy for achievements in the field of language and literature. In 1976, he received a doctorandus degree ad summos honores in sociology and planning at the Free University of Amsterdam.

From 1976 to 1979, he was a Fellow of the Department of External Affairs and the Social Sciences and Humanities Research Council of Canada, representing the Netherlands in a bilateral exchange. Work at the University of Toronto led to a Ph.D. in sociology in 1980.

He accepted an appointment at the Pennsylvania State University in 1979, moving in 1986 to the University of Colorado where he is a professor in the Program in Environmental Design and director of the Children Youth and Environments Center for Research and Design, with an adjoint appointment in the Department of Geography. From 1991 to 2001, he was director of the Center for International Research and Education Projects. He was also director of the PhD program in design and planning from 1997 until 2007. The Japan Foundation awarded him a Fellowship in 1992 for a cross-national study of housing and community supports for elders. In 1989 and in 1999, he received the Award for Faculty Excellence in Research, and in 2008 he was given the Award for Faculty Excellence in Service in the College of Architecture and Planning.

He is or has been a member of the editorial advisory board of the Journal of the American Planning Association, the Journal of Planning Literature, the Journal of Architectural and Planning Research, Urban Affairs Review and Habitat International, among others. He has contributed widely to anthologies and journals in urban studies, planning and environment-behavior studies on issues concerning urban planning, housing, and the linkages between research, policy and practice. He is a past secretary and president of the Research Committee on Housing and the Built Environment of the International Sociological Association (1992–2007), he has worked with colleagues from other fields to promote interdisciplinary and cross-national research. He is active in a number of other national and international professional associations and has been a consultant to the Mayor's the Institute for Urban Design, UN Habitat and other organizations.

In recent years, his work has refocused on the experiences of growing up in cities and intergenerational aspects of urban livability. He is the founder and director of the Children Youth and Environments Center for Research and Design at the University of Colorado and lead editor of the Children Youth and Environments Journal. He takes a special interest in planning and design as participatory processes that include the voices of children, youth and other population groups whose interests tend to be overlooked in community development.

== Books ==
- Habitats for Children: Impacts of Density, (co-edited by J. F. Wohlwill). Hillsdale, NJ: Erlbaum, 1985.
- Housing Needs and Policy Approaches: Trends in 13 Countries, (co-edited by Elizabeth Huttman and Sylvia Fava). Durham, NC: Duke University Press, 1985.
- Housing Markets and Policies under Fiscal Austerity, (editor). Westport, CT: Greenwood press, 1987.
- Housing and Neighborhoods; theoretical and empirical contributions, (co-edited by Harvey Choldin, William Michelson, and David Popenoe). Westport, CT: Greenwood Press. 1987.
- Handbook of Housing and the Built Environment in the U.S., (co-edited by Elizabeth Huttman). Westport, Ct: Greenwood Press. 1988.
- Women, Housing, and Community, (editor). London: Gower Publishing Company. 1988.
- International Handbook of Housing Policies and Practices, (editor). Westport, CT: Greenwood Press. 1990.
- Government and Housing; Developments in Seven Countries, (co-edited by J. van Weesep). Newbury Park, CA: Sage Publications. 1990.
- Affordable Housing and Urban Redevelopment in the U.S.: Learning from Failure and Success, (editor). Thousand Oaks, CA: Sage Publications, Inc., 1996.
- Encyclopedia of Housing (editor). Thousand Oaks, CA: Sage Publications, Inc.,1998.
- Cities in a Globalizing World; Global Report on Human Settlements 2001, (editor), Nairobi: UN Centre for Human Settlements/London: Earthscan. 2002.
