= Reginald DeMerritt Wentworth =

American football player and coach (1868–1918)

Biographical details
- Born: August 31, 1868
- Died: after 1918 (aged at least 49–50)

Playing career
- c. 1890: Princeton

Coaching career (HC unless noted)
- 1894: Texas

Head coaching record
- Overall: 6–1

Reginald DeMerritt Wentworth (August 31, 1868 – after 1918) was an American football coach. He was the first head football coach at the University of Texas at Austin serving one season, in 1894, and compiling a record of 6–1. Following the 1894 season, Wentworth returned to the East Coast and subsequently went into marine insurance in New York City, where he was also an athletic coach at Trinity School. In 1918, Wentworth was appointed as athletic director at the Marine Aeronautic Training Camp in Miami, Florida. Wentworth graduated from Williams College in 1891.

== Head coaching record ==
Year	Team	Overall	Conference	Standing	Bowl/playoffs
Texas Longhorns (Independent) (1894)
1894	Texas	6–1			
Texas:		6–1			
Total:		6–1			
