= Environment and Behavior =

Bimonthly academic journal

- Discipline: Psychology
- Language: English
- Edited by: Sonya Sachdeva

Publication details
- History: 1969–present
- Publisher: SAGE Publications
- Frequency: 10/year
- Impact factor: 5.141 (2019)

Standard abbreviations
- ISO 4: Environ. Behav.

Indexing
- CODEN: EVBHAF
- ISSN: 0013-9165 (print); 1552-390X (web)
- LCCN: 73007395
- OCLC no.: 1568065

Links
- Journal homepage; Online access; Online archive

Environment and Behavior is a bimonthly peer-reviewed academic journal covering the fields of environmental psychology and environmental studies. The editor-in-chief is Sonya Sachdeva (USDA Forest Service). It was established in 1969 and is published by SAGE Publications. The journal examines relationships between human behavior and the natural and built environment.

== Abstracting and indexing ==
The journal is abstracted and indexed in Scopus, PsycINFO and the Social Sciences Citation Index. According to the Journal Citation Reports, its 2019 impact factor is 5.141
