= Mathematics and architecture =

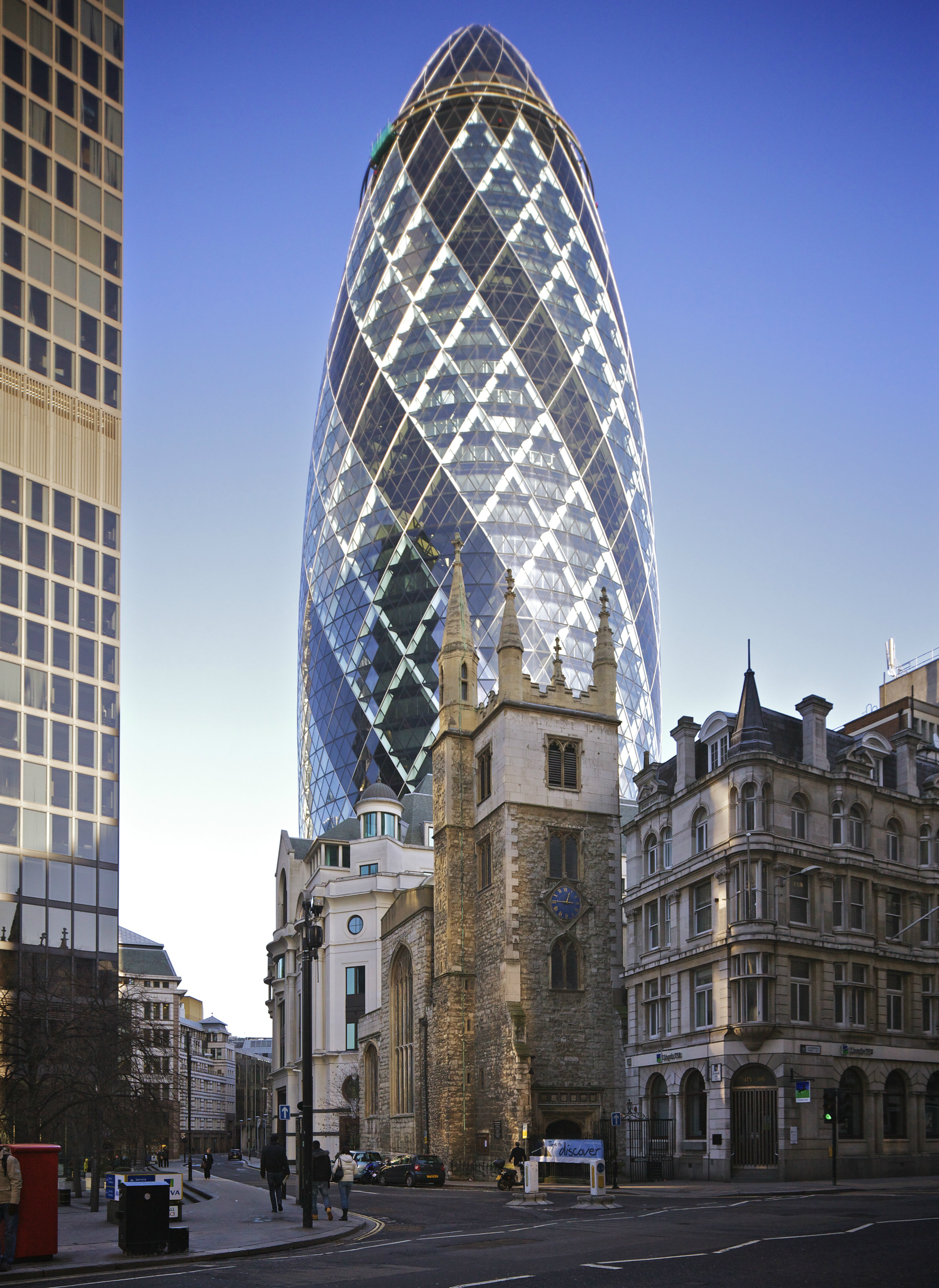
"The Gherkin", 30 St Mary Axe, London, completed 2003, is a parametrically designed solid of revolution.

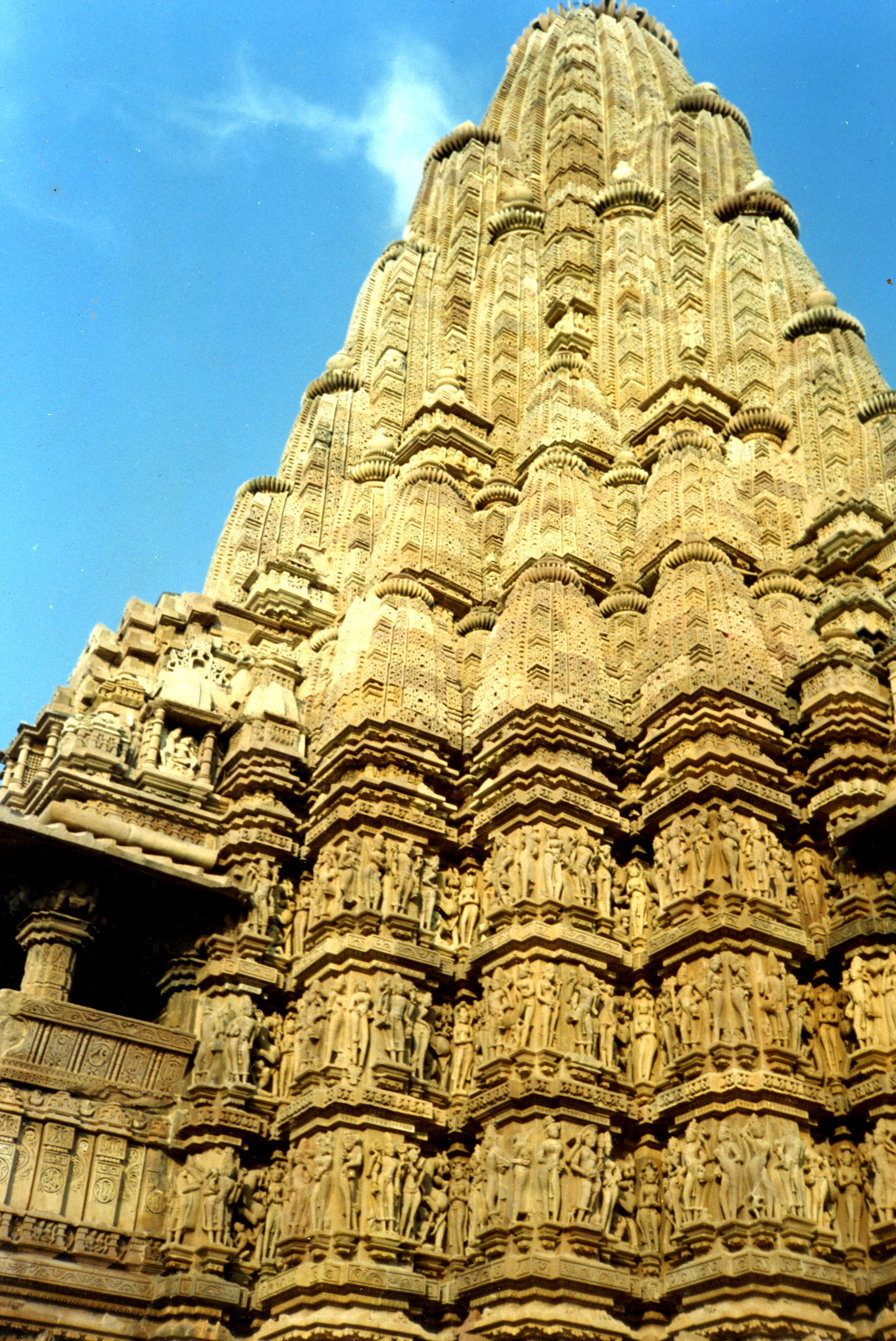
Detail of Kandariya Mahadeva Temple (c. 1030), Khajuraho, India, showing religious architecture with a fractal-like structure of many parts that resemble the whole.

Mathematics and architecture are related, since architecture, like some other arts, uses mathematics for several reasons. Apart from the mathematics needed when engineering buildings, architects use geometry: to define the spatial form of a building; from the Pythagoreans of the sixth century BC onwards, to create architectural forms considered harmonious, and thus to lay out buildings and their surroundings according to mathematical, aesthetic and sometimes religious principles; to decorate buildings with mathematical objects such as tessellations; and to meet environmental goals, such as to minimise wind speeds around the bases of tall buildings.

In ancient Egypt, ancient Greece, India, and the Islamic world, buildings including pyramids, temples, mosques, palaces and mausoleums were laid out with specific proportions for religious reasons. In Islamic architecture, geometric shapes and geometric tiling patterns are used to decorate buildings, both inside and outside. Some Hindu temples have a fractal-like structure where parts resemble the whole, conveying a message about the infinite in Hindu cosmology. In Chinese architecture, the tulou of Fujian province are circular, communal defensive structures. In the twenty-first century, mathematical ornamentation is again being used to cover public buildings.

In Renaissance architecture, symmetry and proportion were deliberately emphasized by architects such as Leon Battista Alberti, Sebastiano Serlio and Andrea Palladio, influenced by Vitruvius's De architectura from ancient Rome and the arithmetic of the Pythagoreans from ancient Greece. At the end of the nineteenth century, Vladimir Shukhov in Russia and Antoni Gaudí in Barcelona pioneered the use of hyperboloid structures; in the Sagrada Família, Gaudí also incorporated hyperbolic paraboloids, tessellations, catenary arches, catenoids, helicoids, and ruled surfaces. In the twentieth century, styles such as modern architecture and Deconstructivism explored different geometries to achieve desired effects. Minimal surfaces have been exploited in tent-like roof coverings as at Denver International Airport, while Richard Buckminster Fuller pioneered the use of the strong thin-shell structures known as geodesic domes.

== Connected fields ==
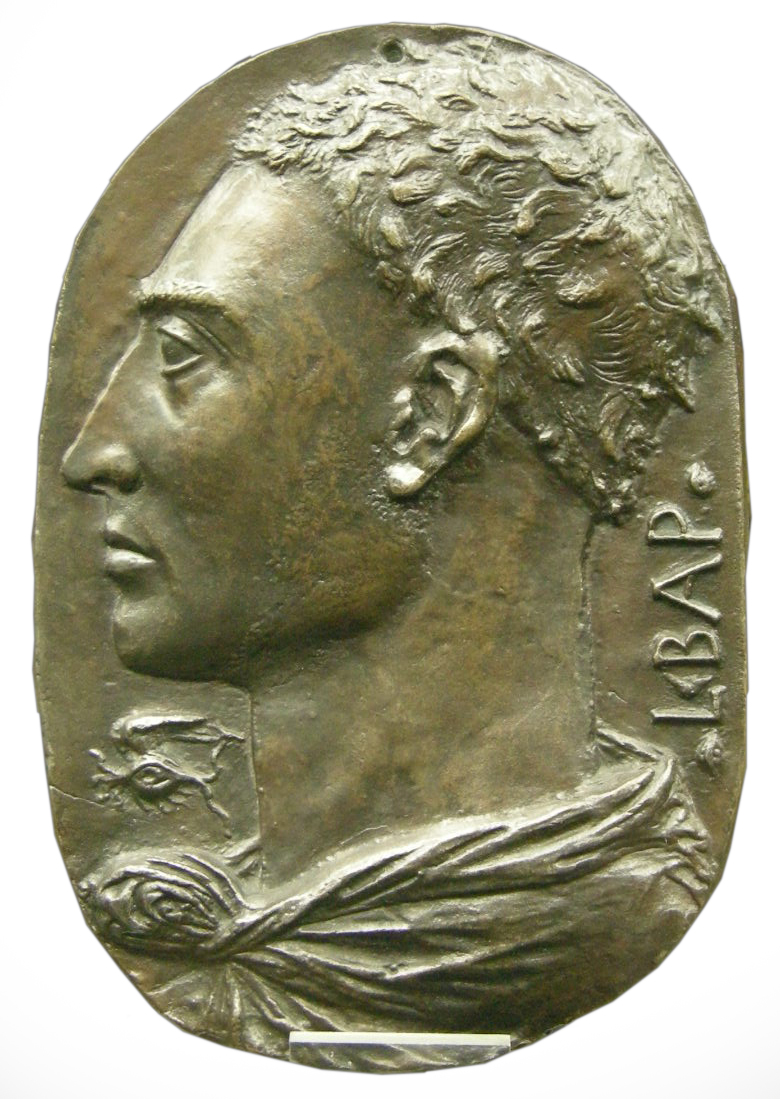
In the Renaissance, an architect like Leon Battista Alberti was expected to be knowledgeable in many disciplines, including arithmetic and geometry.

The architects Michael Ostwald and Kim Williams, considering the relationships between architecture and mathematics, note that the fields as commonly understood might seem to be only weakly connected, since architecture is a profession concerned with the practical matter of making buildings, while mathematics is the pure study of number and other abstract objects. But, they argue, the two are strongly connected, and have been since antiquity. In ancient Rome, Vitruvius described an architect as a man who knew enough of a range of other disciplines, primarily geometry, to enable him to oversee skilled artisans in all the other necessary areas, such as masons and carpenters. The same applied in the Middle Ages, where graduates learnt arithmetic, geometry and aesthetics alongside the basic syllabus of grammar, logic, and rhetoric (the trivium) in elegant halls made by master builders who had guided many craftsmen. A master builder at the top of his profession was given the title of architect or engineer. In the Renaissance, the quadrivium of arithmetic, geometry, music and astronomy became an extra syllabus expected of the Renaissance man such as Leon Battista Alberti. Similarly in England, Sir Christopher Wren, known today as an architect, was firstly a noted astronomer.

Williams and Ostwald, further overviewing the interaction of mathematics and architecture since 1500 according to the approach of the German sociologist Theodor Adorno, identify three tendencies among architects, namely: to be revolutionary, introducing wholly new ideas; reactionary, failing to introduce change; or revivalist, actually going backwards. They argue that architects have avoided looking to mathematics for inspiration in revivalist times. This would explain why in revivalist periods, such as the Gothic Revival in 19th century England, architecture had little connection to mathematics. Equally, they note that in reactionary times such as the Italian Mannerism of about 1520 to 1580, or the 17th century Baroque and Palladian movements, mathematics was barely consulted. In contrast, the revolutionary early 20th-century movements such as Futurism and Constructivism actively rejected old ideas, embracing mathematics and leading to Modernist architecture. Towards the end of the 20th century, too, fractal geometry was quickly seized upon by architects, as was aperiodic tiling, to provide interesting and attractive coverings for buildings.

Architects use mathematics for several reasons, leaving aside the necessary use of mathematics in the engineering of buildings. Firstly, they use geometry because it defines the spatial form of a building. Secondly, they use mathematics to design forms that are considered beautiful or harmonious. From the time of the Pythagoreans with their religious philosophy of number, architects in ancient Greece, ancient Rome, the Islamic world and the Italian Renaissance have chosen the proportions of the built environment – buildings and their designed surroundings – according to mathematical as well as aesthetic and sometimes religious principles. Thirdly, they may use mathematical objects such as tessellations to decorate buildings. Fourthly, they may use mathematics in the form of computer modelling to meet environmental goals, such as to minimise whirling air currents at the base of tall buildings.

== Secular aesthetics ==
=== Ancient Rome ===
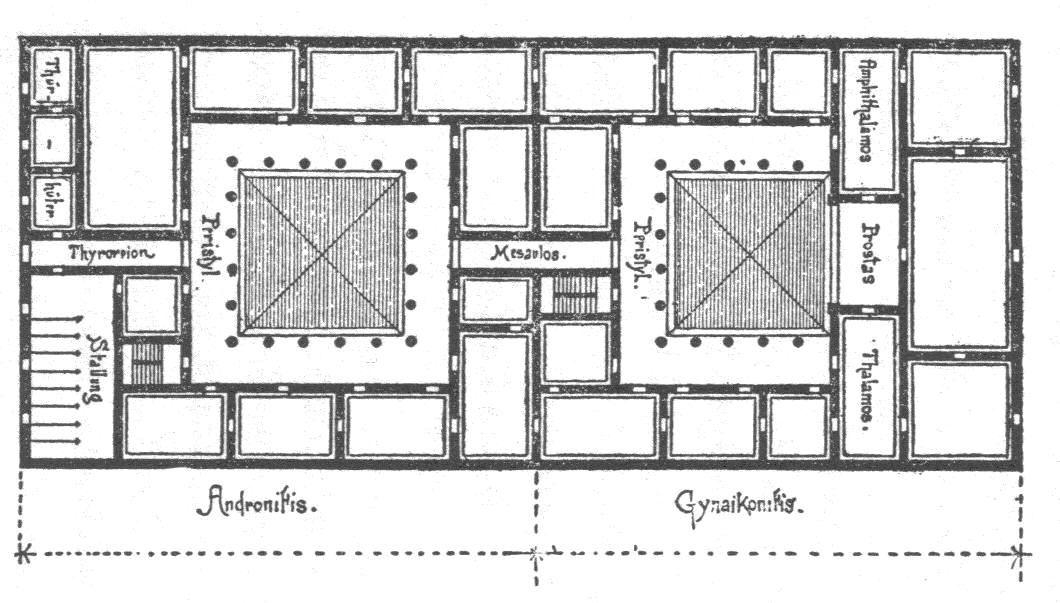
Plan of a Greek house by Vitruvius

==== Vitruvius ====
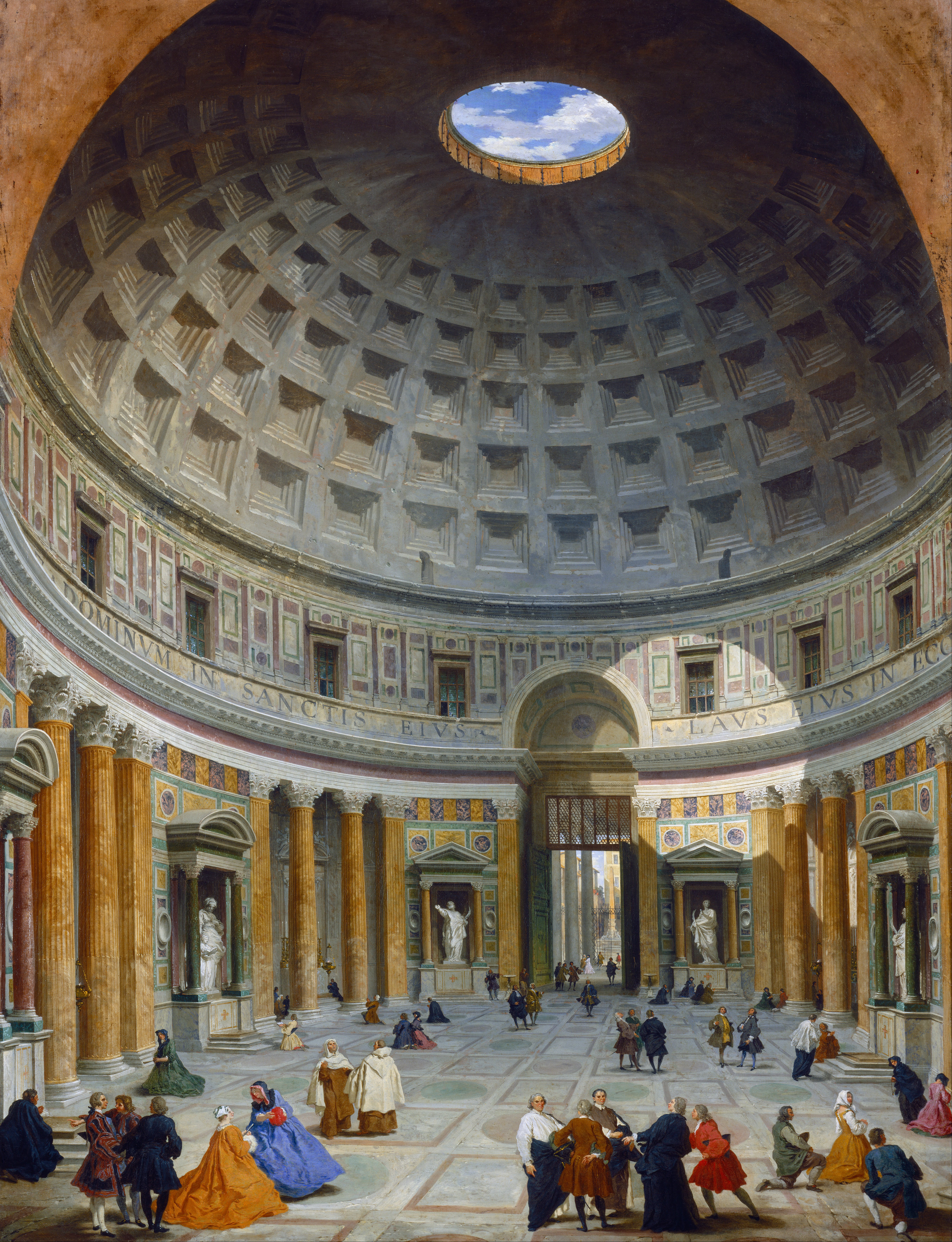
The interior of the Pantheon by Giovanni Paolo Panini, 1758

The influential ancient Roman architect Vitruvius argued that the design of a building such as a temple depends on two qualities, proportion and symmetria. Proportion ensures that each part of a building relates harmoniously to every other part. Symmetria in Vitruvius's usage means something closer to the English term modularity than mirror symmetry, as again it relates to the assembling of (modular) parts into the whole building. In his Basilica at Fano, he uses ratios of small integers, especially the triangular numbers (1, 3, 6, 10, ...) to proportion the structure into (Vitruvian) modules. (Note: In Book 4, chapter 3 of De architectura, he discusses modules directly.) Thus the Basilica's width to length is 1:2; the aisle around it is as high as it is wide, 1:1; the columns are five feet thick and fifty feet high, 1:10.

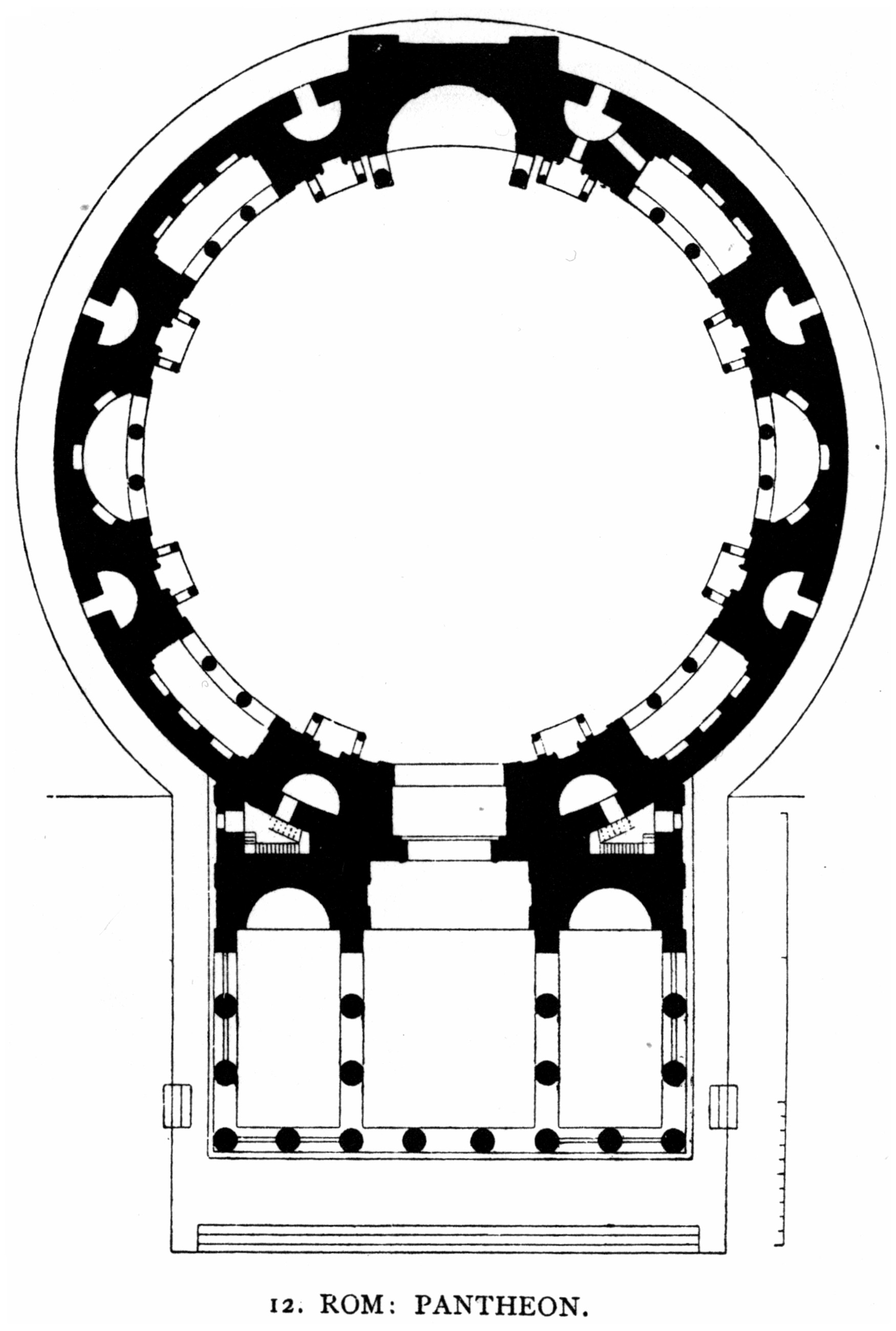
Floor plan of the Pantheon

Vitruvius named three qualities required of architecture in his De architectura, c. 15 B.C.: firmness, usefulness (or "Commodity" in Henry Wotton's 17th century English), and delight. These can be used as categories for classifying the ways in which mathematics is used in architecture. Firmness encompasses the use of mathematics to ensure a building stands up, hence the mathematical tools used in design and to support construction, for instance to ensure stability and to model performance. Usefulness derives in part from the effective application of mathematics, reasoning about and analysing the spatial and other relationships in a design. Delight is an attribute of the resulting building, resulting from the embodying of mathematical relationships in the building; it includes aesthetic, sensual and intellectual qualities.

==== The Pantheon ====
The Pantheon in Rome has survived intact, illustrating classical Roman structure, proportion, and decoration. The main structure is a dome, the apex left open as a circular oculus to let in light; it is fronted by a short colonnade with a triangular pediment. The height to the oculus and the diameter of the interior circle are the same, 43.3 metres (142 ft), so the whole interior would fit exactly within a cube, and the interior could house a sphere of the same diameter. These dimensions make more sense when expressed in ancient Roman units of measurement: The dome spans 150 Roman feet (Note: A Roman foot was about 0.296 metres (0.97 ft).)); the oculus is 30 Roman feet in diameter; the doorway is 40 Roman feet high. The Pantheon remains the world's largest unreinforced concrete dome.

=== Renaissance ===
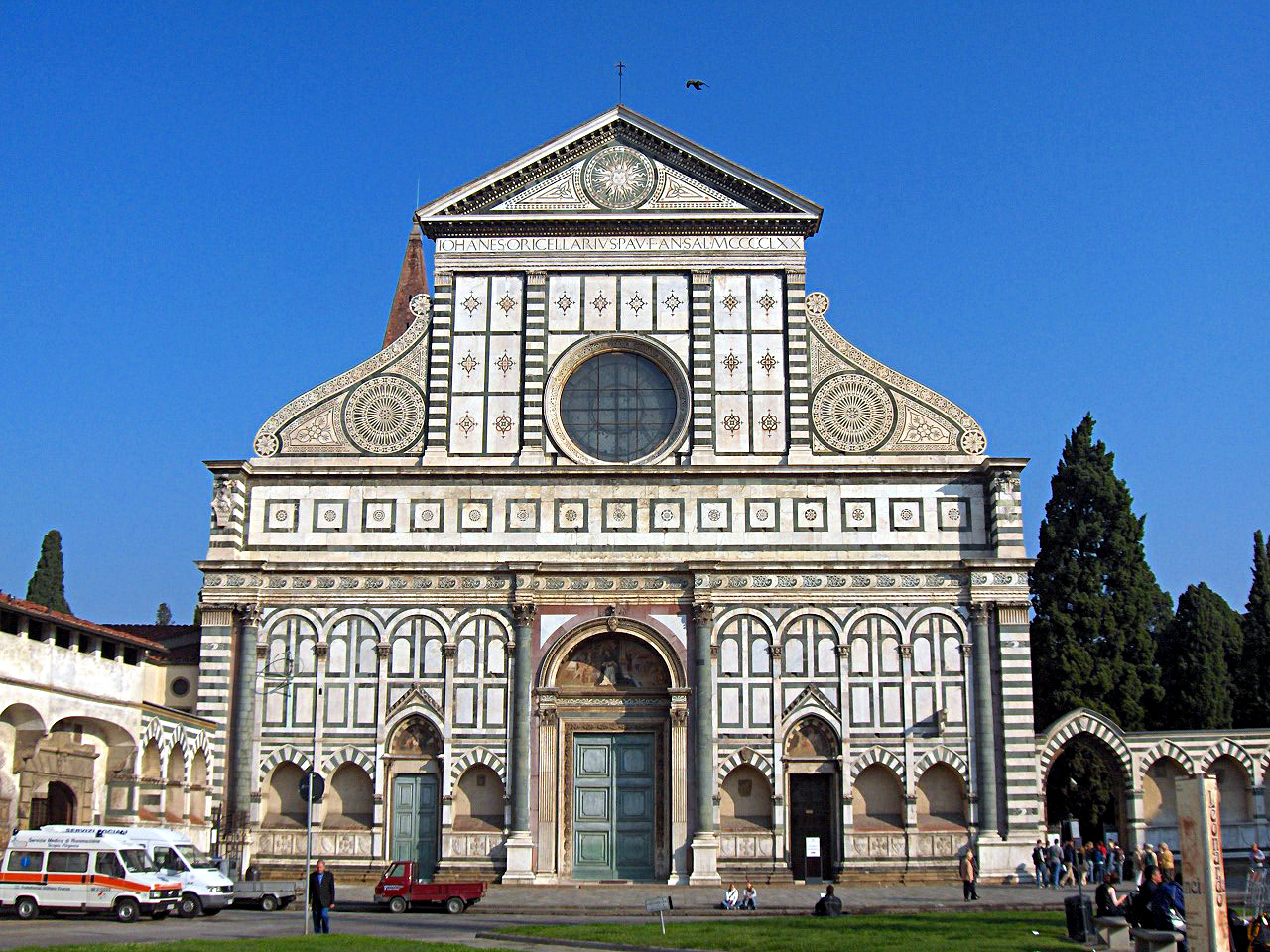
Facade of Santa Maria Novella, Florence, 1470. The frieze (with squares) and above is by Leon Battista Alberti.

The first Renaissance treatise on architecture was Leon Battista Alberti's 1450 De re aedificatoria (On the Art of Building); it became the first printed book on architecture in 1485. It was partly based on Vitruvius's De architectura and, via Nicomachus, Pythagorean arithmetic. Alberti starts with a cube, and derives ratios from it. Thus the diagonal of a face gives the ratio 1:√2, while the diameter of the sphere which circumscribes the cube gives 1:√3. Alberti also documented Filippo Brunelleschi's discovery of linear perspective, developed to enable the design of buildings which would look beautifully proportioned when viewed from a convenient distance.

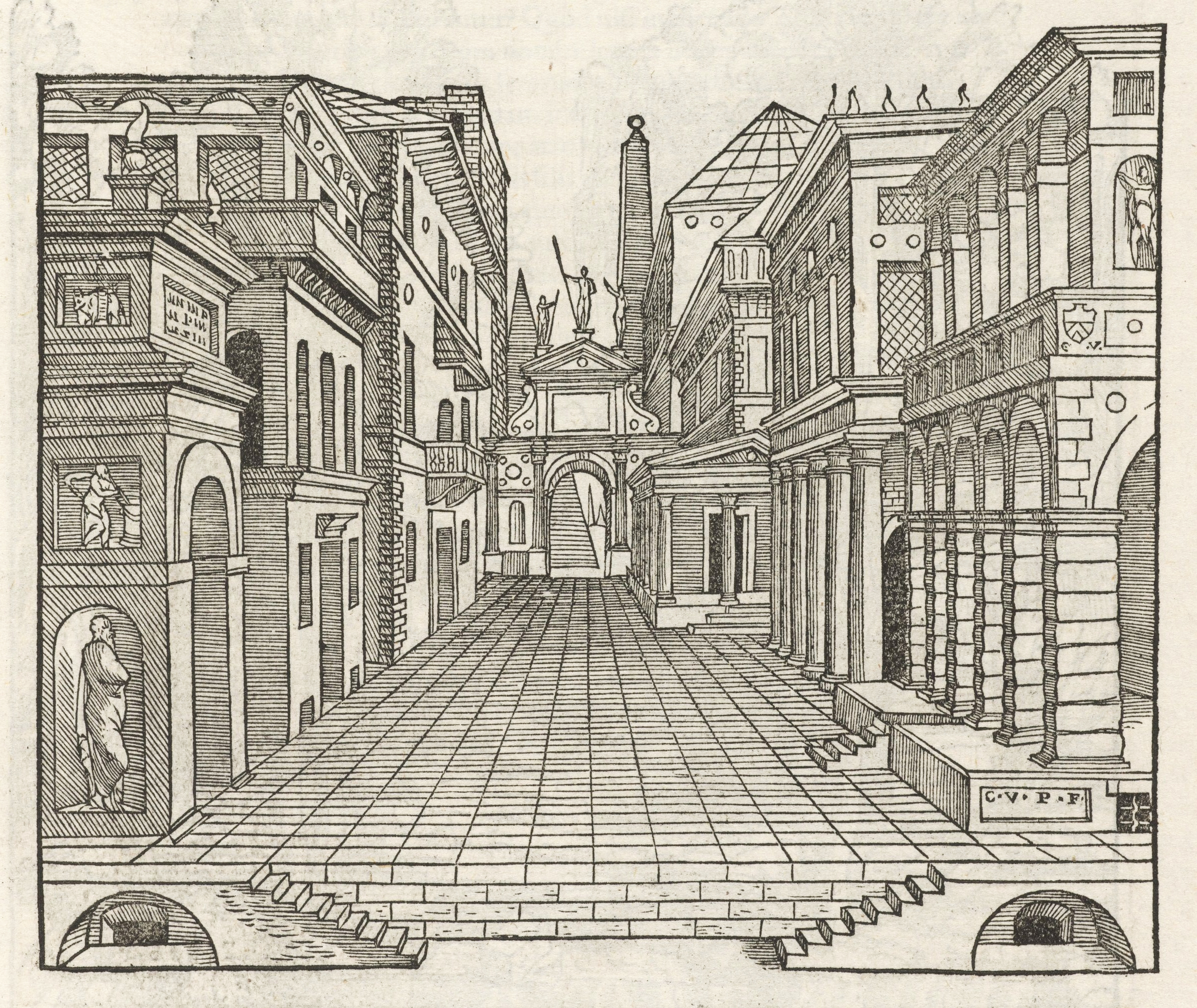
Architectural perspective of a stage set by Sebastiano Serlio, 1569

The next major text was Sebastiano Serlio's Regole generali d'architettura (General Rules of Architecture); the first volume appeared in Venice in 1537; the 1545 volume (books 1 and 2) covered geometry and perspective. Two of Serlio's methods for constructing perspectives were wrong, but this did not stop his work being widely used.

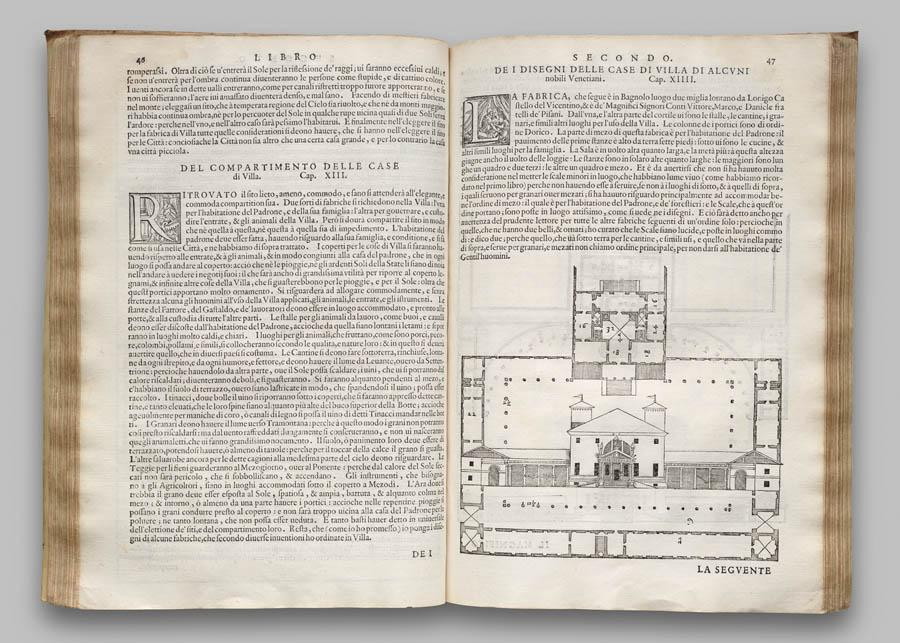
Andrea Palladio's plan and elevation of the Villa Pisani

In 1570, Andrea Palladio published the influential I quattro libri dell'architettura (The Four Books of Architecture) in Venice. This widely printed book was largely responsible for spreading the ideas of the Italian Renaissance throughout Europe, assisted by proponents like the English diplomat Henry Wotton with his 1624 The Elements of Architecture. The proportions of each room within the villa were calculated on simple mathematical ratios like 3:4 and 4:5, and the different rooms within the house were interrelated by these ratios. Earlier architects had used these formulas for balancing a single symmetrical facade; however, Palladio's designs related to the whole, usually square, villa. Palladio permitted a range of ratios in the Quattro libri, stating:

There are seven types of room that are the most beautiful and well proportioned and turn out better: they can be made circular, though these are rare; or square; or their length will equal the diagonal of the square of the breadth; or a square and a third; or a square and a half; or a square and two-thirds; or two squares. (Note: In modern algebraic notation, these ratios are respectively 1:1, √2:1, 4:3, 3:2, 5:3, 2:1.)

In 1615, Vincenzo Scamozzi published the late Renaissance treatise L'idea dell'architettura universale (The Idea of a Universal Architecture). He attempted to relate the design of cities and buildings to the ideas of Vitruvius and the Pythagoreans, and to the more recent ideas of Palladio.

=== Nineteenth century ===
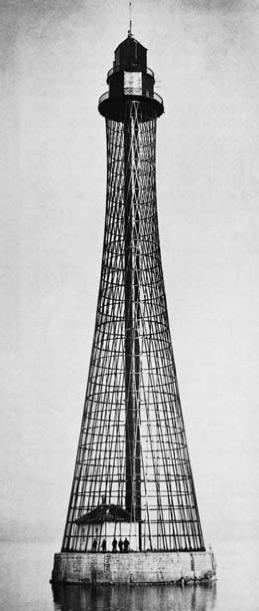
Hyperboloid lattice lighthouse by Vladimir Shukhov, Ukraine, 1911

Hyperboloid structures were used starting towards the end of the nineteenth century by Vladimir Shukhov for masts, lighthouses and cooling towers. Their striking shape is both aesthetically interesting and strong, using structural materials economically. Shukhov's first hyperboloidal tower was exhibited in Nizhny Novgorod in 1896.

=== Twentieth century ===
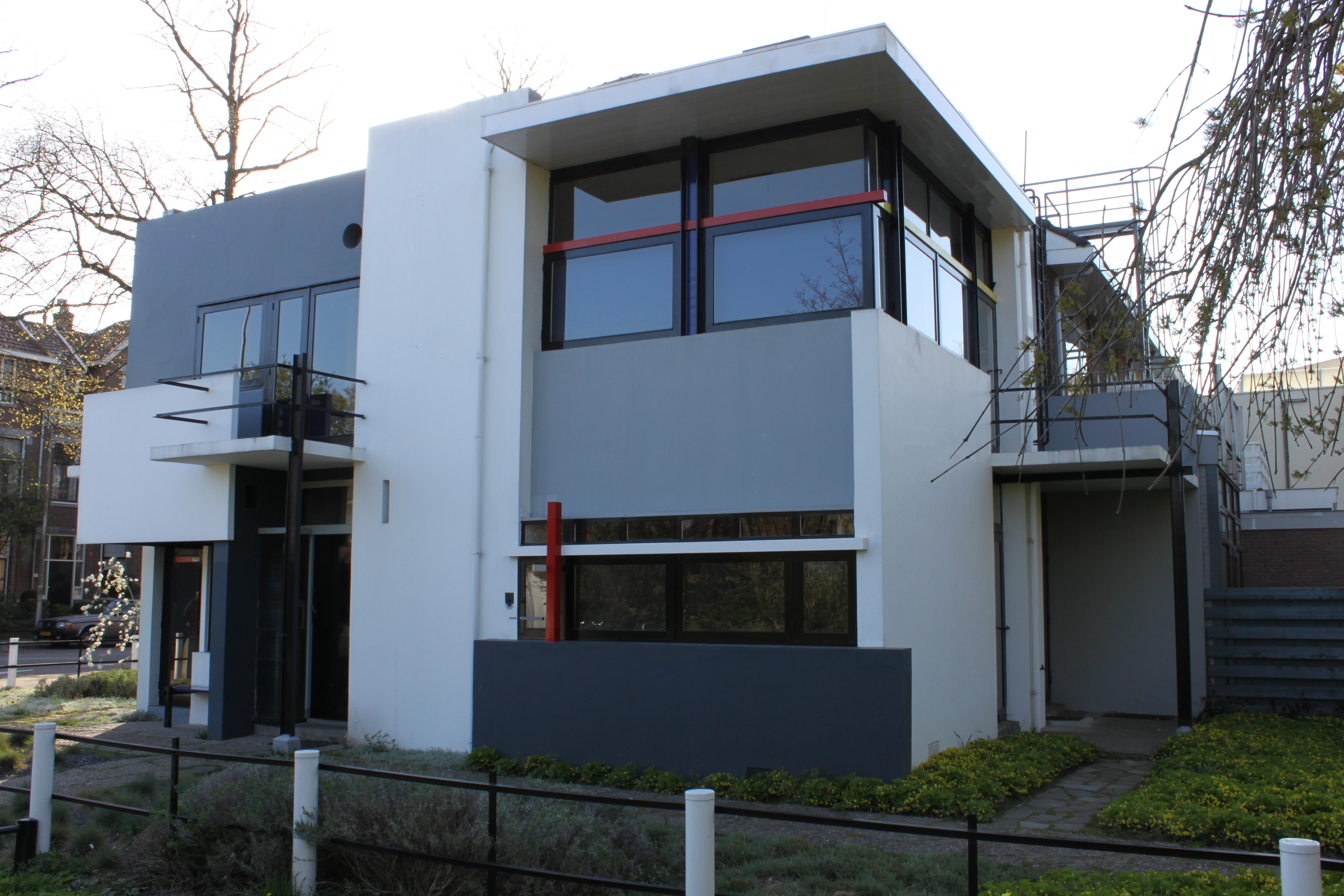
De Stijl's sliding, intersecting planes: the Rietveld Schröder House, 1924

The early twentieth century movement Modern architecture, pioneered (Note: Constructivism influenced Bauhaus and Le Corbusier, for example.) by Russian Constructivism, used rectilinear Euclidean (also called Cartesian) geometry. In the De Stijl movement, the horizontal and the vertical were seen as constituting the universal. The architectural form consists of putting these two directional tendencies together, using roof planes, wall planes and balconies, which either slide past or intersect each other, as in the 1924 Rietveld Schröder House by Gerrit Rietveld.

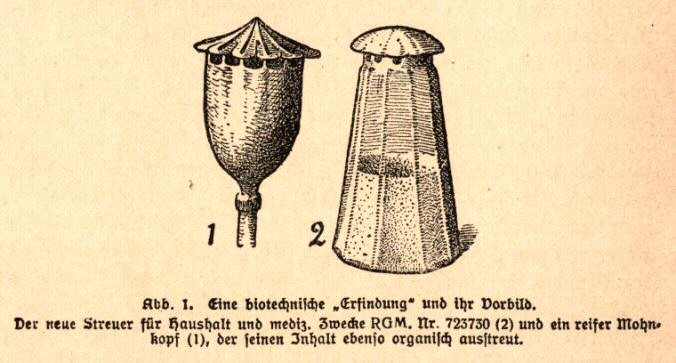
Raoul Heinrich Francé's poppy and pepperpot (biomimetics) image from Die Pflanze als Erfinder, 1920

Modernist architects were free to make use of curves as well as planes. Charles Holden's 1933 Arnos station has a circular ticket hall in brick with a flat concrete roof. In 1938, the Bauhaus painter László Moholy-Nagy adopted Raoul Heinrich Francé's seven biotechnical elements, namely the crystal, the sphere, the cone, the plane, the (cuboidal) strip, the (cylindrical) rod, and the spiral, as the supposed basic building blocks of architecture inspired by nature.

Le Corbusier proposed an anthropometric scale of proportions in architecture, the Modulor, based on the supposed height of a man. Le Corbusier's 1955 Chapelle Notre-Dame du Haut uses free-form curves not describable in mathematical formulae. (Note: Pace Nikos Salingaros, who suggests the contrary, but it is not clear exactly what mathematics may be embodied in the curves of Le Corbusier's chapel.) The shapes are said to be evocative of natural forms such as the prow of a ship or praying hands. The design is only at the largest scale: there is no hierarchy of detail at smaller scales, and thus no fractal dimension; the same applies to other famous twentieth-century buildings such as the Sydney Opera House, Denver International Airport, and the Guggenheim Museum, Bilbao.

Contemporary architecture, in the opinion of the 90 leading architects who responded to a 2010 World Architecture Survey, is extremely diverse; the best was judged to be Frank Gehry's Guggenheim Museum, Bilbao.

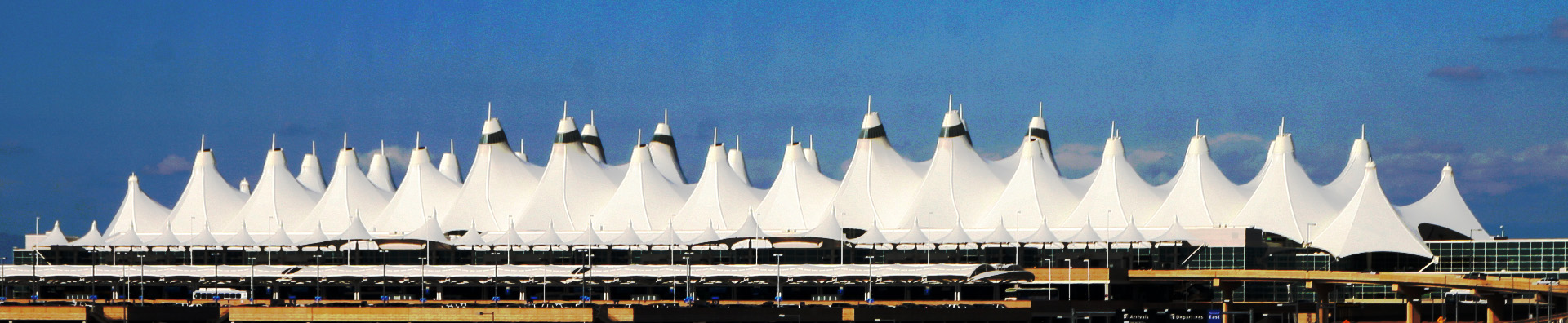
The minimal surfaces of the fabric roof of Denver International Airport, completed in 1995, evoke Colorado's snow-capped mountains and the teepee tents of Native Americans.

Denver International Airport's terminal building, completed in 1995, has a fabric roof supported as a minimal surface (i.e., its mean curvature is zero) by steel cables. It evokes Colorado's snow-capped mountains and the teepee tents of Native Americans.

The architect Richard Buckminster Fuller is famous for designing strong thin-shell structures known as geodesic domes. The Montréal Biosphère dome is 61 metres (200 ft) high; its diameter is 76 metres (249 ft).

Sydney Opera House has a dramatic roof consisting of soaring white vaults, reminiscent of ship's sails; to make them possible to construct using standardized components, the vaults are all composed of triangular sections of spherical shells with the same radius. These have the required uniform curvature in every direction.

The late twentieth century movement Deconstructivism creates deliberate disorder with what Nikos Salingaros in A Theory of Architecture calls random forms of high complexity by using non-parallel walls, superimposed grids and complex 2-D surfaces, as in Frank Gehry's Disney Concert Hall and Guggenheim Museum, Bilbao. Until the twentieth century, architecture students were obliged to have a grounding in mathematics. Salingaros argues that first "overly simplistic, politically-driven" Modernism and then "anti-scientific" Deconstructivism have effectively separated architecture from mathematics. He believes that this "reversal of mathematical values" is harmful, as the "pervasive aesthetic" of non-mathematical architecture trains people "to reject mathematical information in the built environment"; he argues that this has negative effects on society.

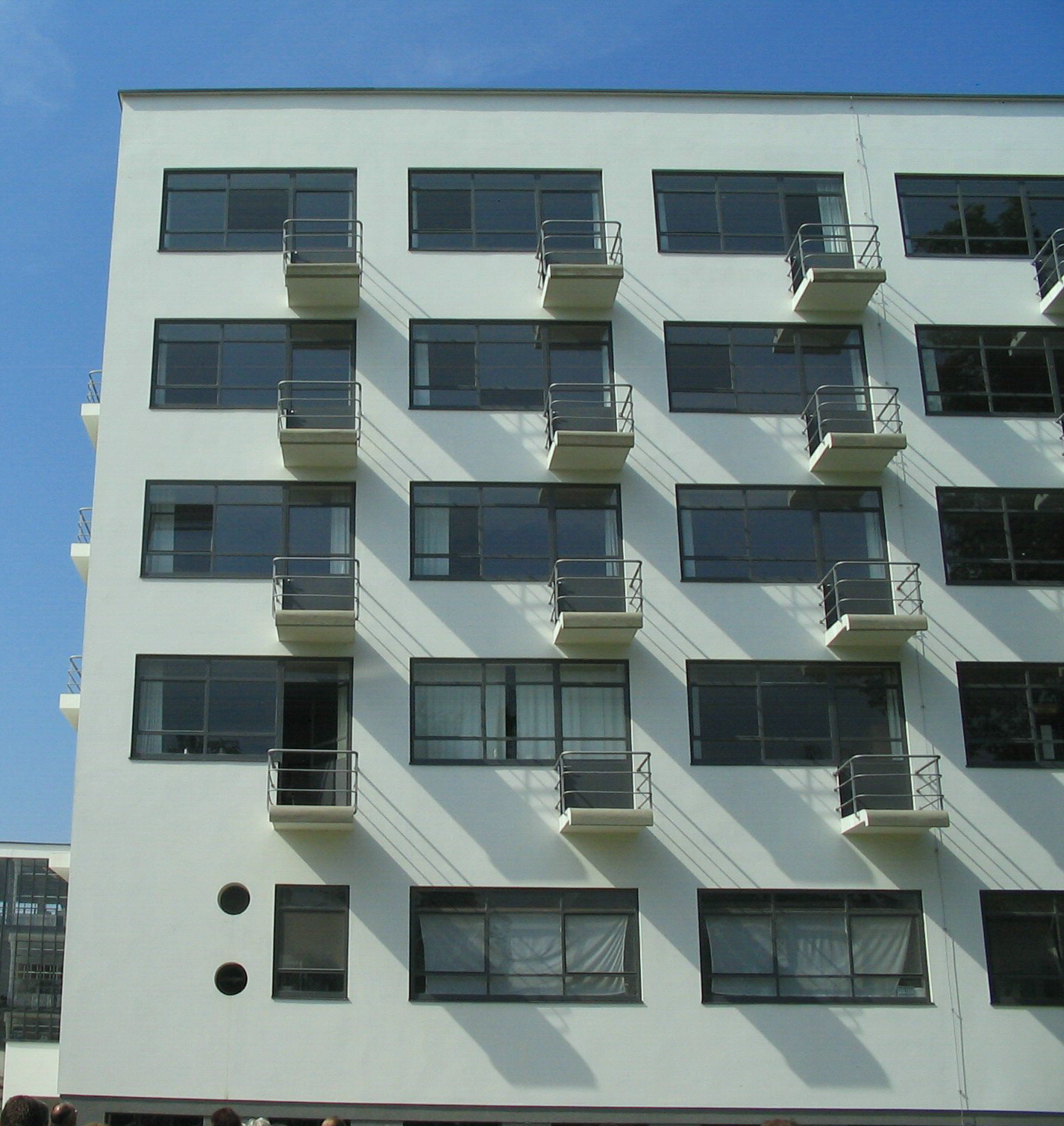
New Objectivity: Walter Gropius's Bauhaus, Dessau, 1925

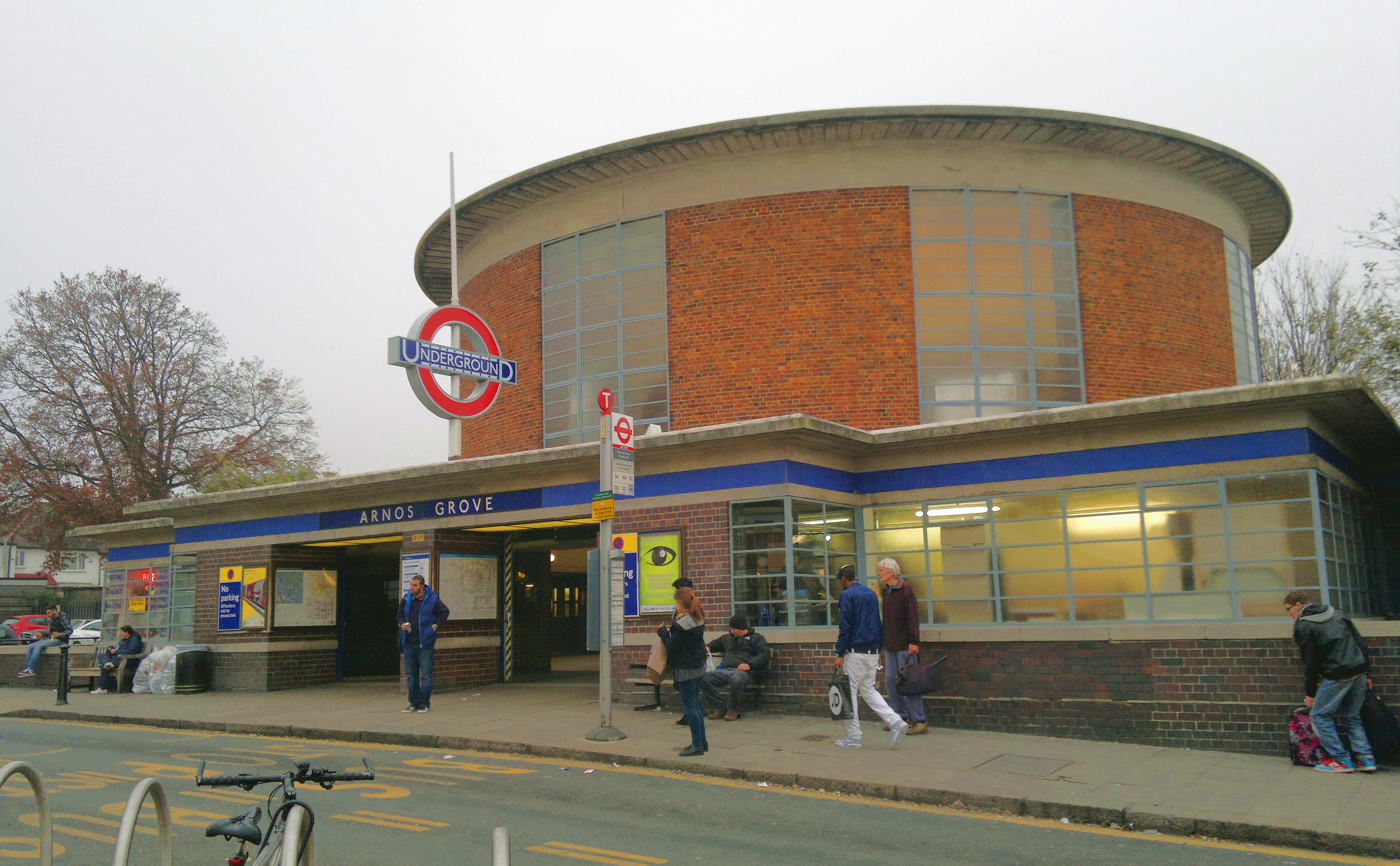
Cylinder: Charles Holden's Arnos Grove tube station, 1933

Modernism: Le Corbusier's Chapelle Notre Dame du Haut, 1955

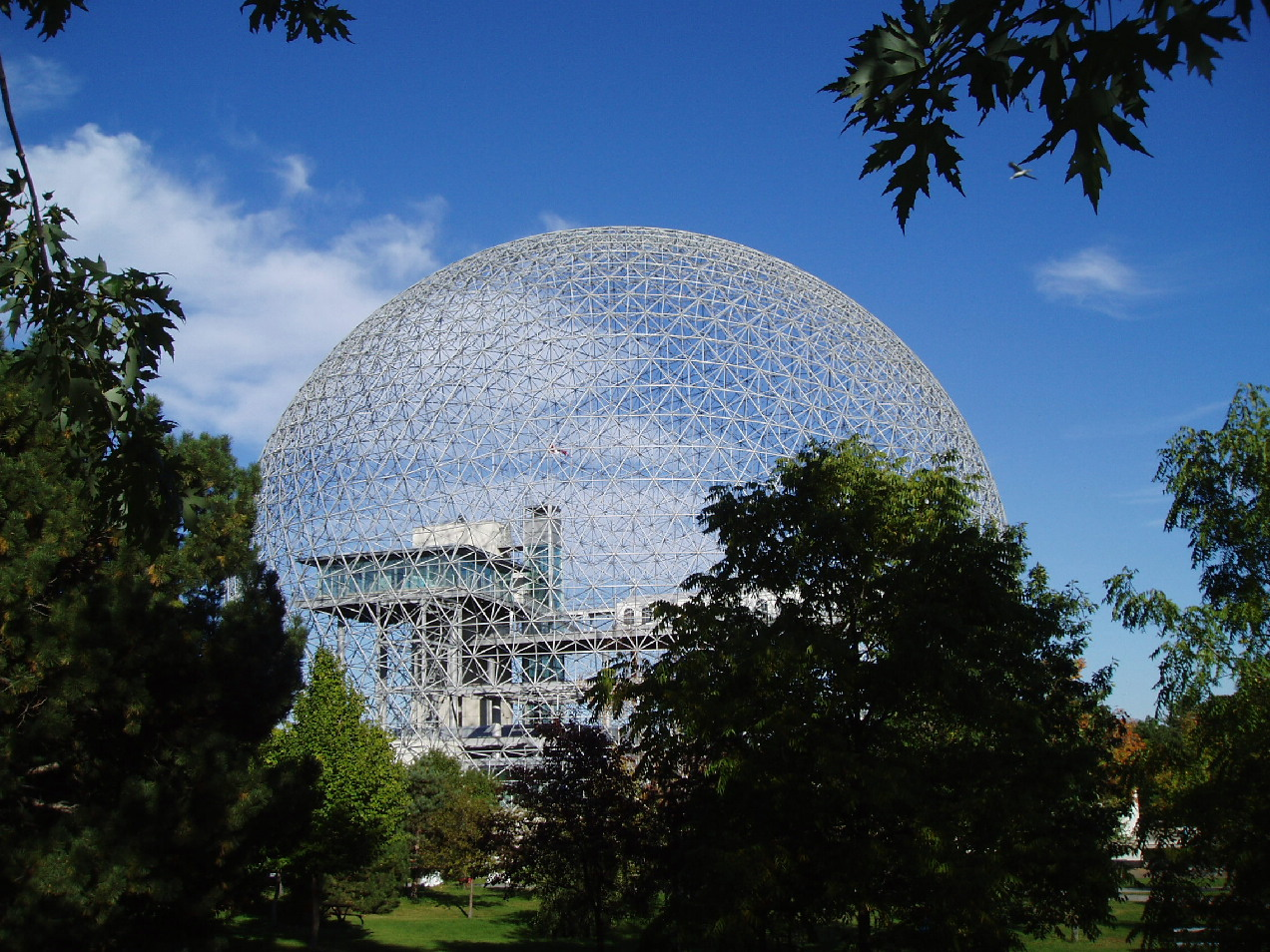
Geodesic dome: the Montréal Biosphère by R. Buckminster Fuller, 1967

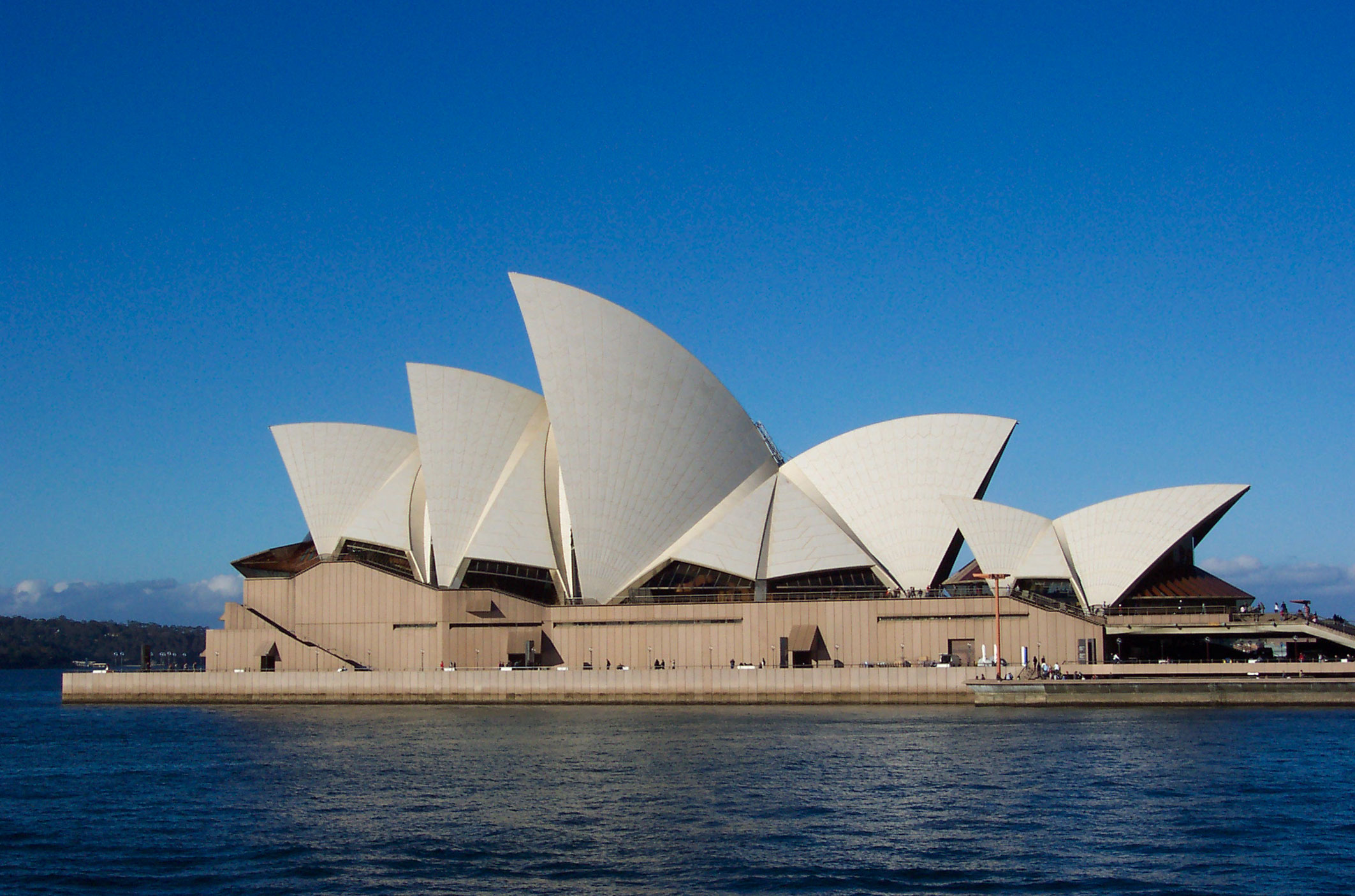
Uniform curvature: Sydney Opera House, 1973

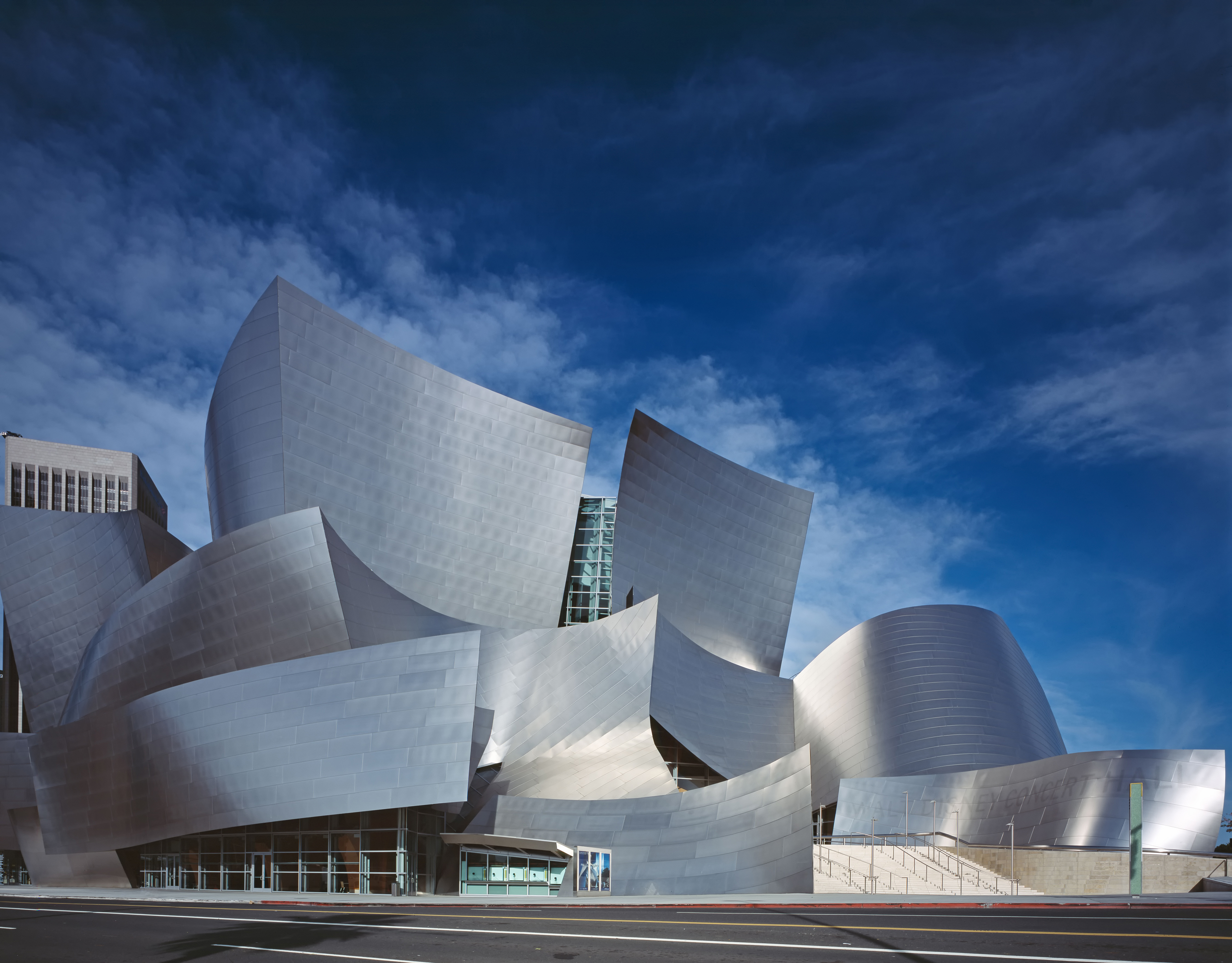
Deconstructivism: Disney Concert Hall, Los Angeles, 2003

== Religious principles ==
=== Ancient Egypt ===
Base:hypotenuse (b:a) ratios for pyramids like the Great Pyramid of Giza could be: 1:φ (Kepler triangle), 3:5 (3:4:5 triangle), or 1:4/π

The pyramids of ancient Egypt are tombs constructed with mathematical proportions, but which these were, and whether the Pythagorean theorem was used, are debated. The ratio of the slant height to half the base length of the Great Pyramid of Giza is less than 1% from the golden ratio. If this was the design method, it would imply the use of Kepler's triangle (face angle 51°49'), but according to many historians of science, the golden ratio was not known until the time of the Pythagoreans.

The proportions of some pyramids may have also been based on the 3:4:5 triangle (face angle 53°8'), known from the Rhind Mathematical Papyrus (c. 1650–1550 BC); this was first conjectured by historian Moritz Cantor in 1882. It is known that right angles were laid out accurately in ancient Egypt using knotted cords for measurement, that Plutarch recorded in Isis and Osiris (c. 100 AD) that the Egyptians admired the 3:4:5 triangle, and that a scroll from before 1700 BC demonstrated basic square formulas. (Note: Berlin Papyrus 6619 from the Middle Kingdom stated that "the area of a square of 100 is equal to that of two smaller squares. The side of one is ½ + ¼ the side of the other.") Historian Roger L. Cooke observes that "It is hard to imagine anyone being interested in such conditions without knowing the Pythagorean theorem," but also notes that no Egyptian text before 300 BC actually mentions the use of the theorem to find the length of a triangle's sides, and that there are simpler ways to construct a right angle. Cooke concludes that Cantor's conjecture remains uncertain; he guesses that the ancient Egyptians probably knew the Pythagorean theorem, but "there is no evidence that they used it to construct right angles."

=== Ancient India ===
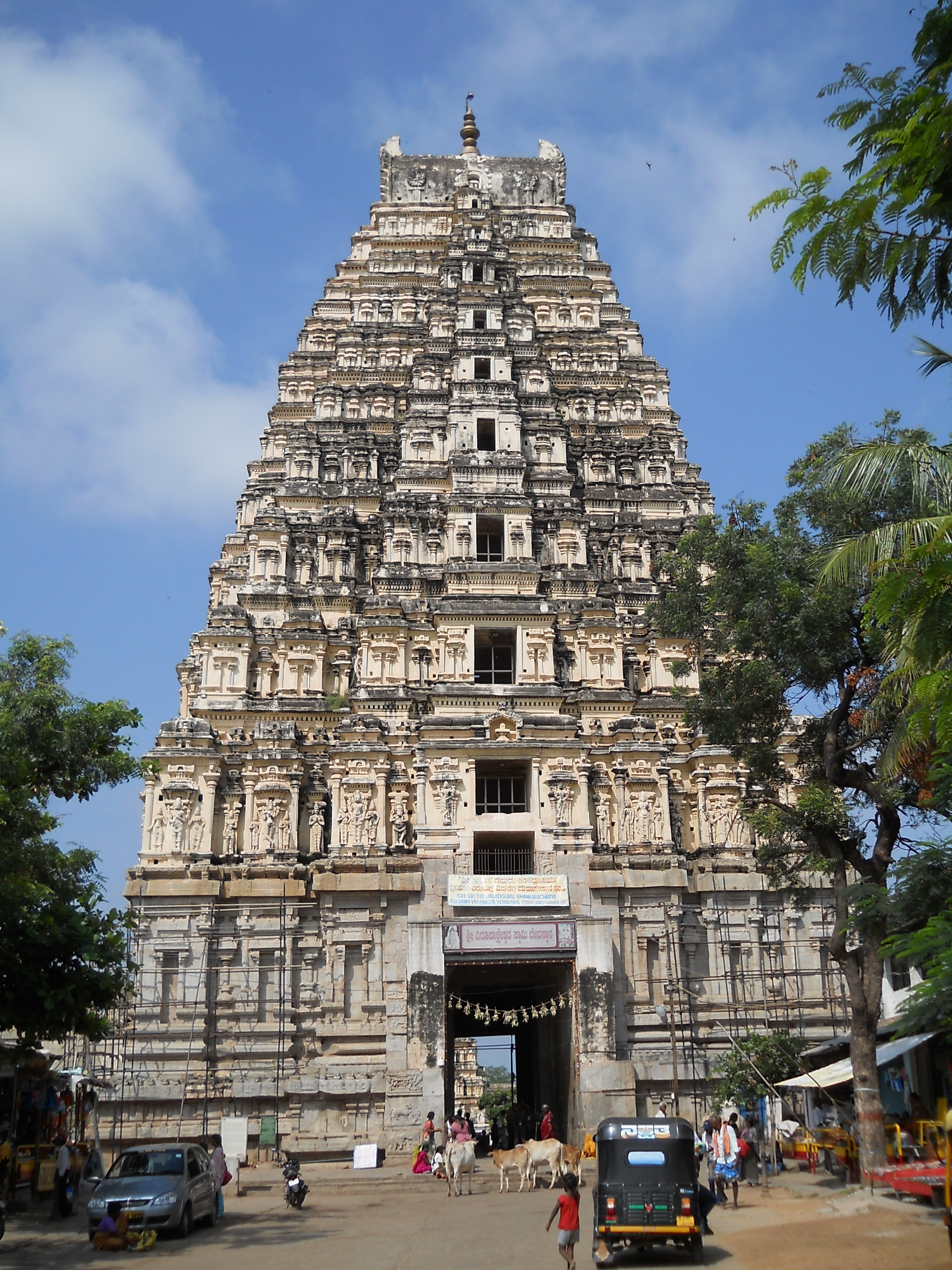
Gopuram of the Hindu Virupaksha Temple has a fractal-like structure where the parts resemble the whole.

Vaastu Shastra, the ancient Indian canons of architecture and town planning, employs symmetrical drawings called mandalas. Complex calculations are used to arrive at the dimensions of a building and its components. The designs are intended to integrate architecture with nature, the relative functions of various parts of the structure, and ancient beliefs utilizing geometric patterns (yantra), symmetry and directional alignments. However, early builders may have come upon mathematical proportions by accident. The mathematician Georges Ifrah notes that simple "tricks" with string and stakes can be used to lay out geometric shapes, such as ellipses and right angles.

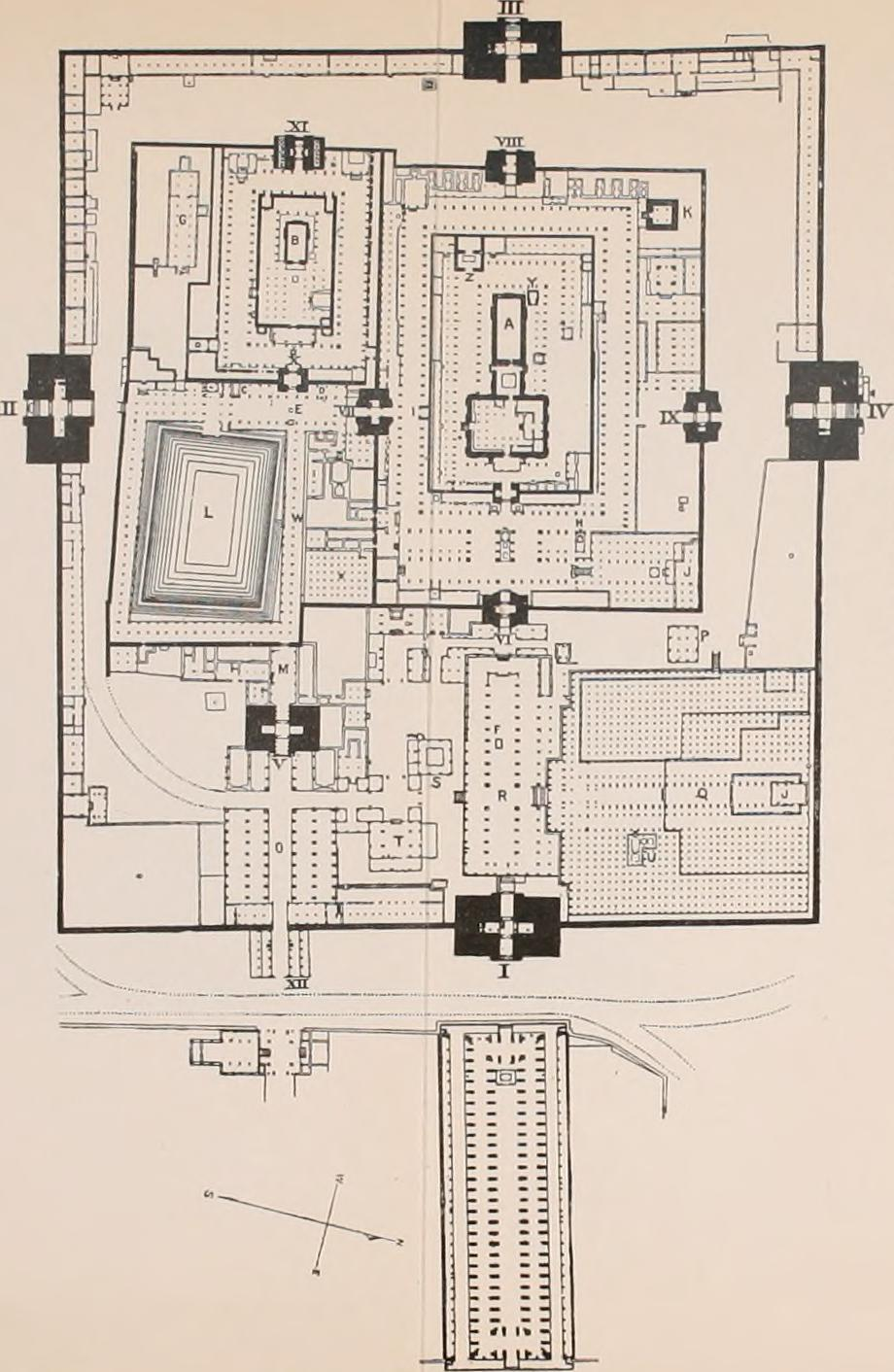
Plan of Meenakshi Amman Temple, Madurai, from the 7th century onwards. The four gateways (numbered I-IV) are tall gopurams.

The mathematics of fractals has been used to show that the reason why existing buildings have universal appeal and are visually satisfying is because they provide the viewer with a sense of scale at different viewing distances. For example, in the tall gopuram gatehouses of Hindu temples such as the Virupaksha Temple at Hampi built in the seventh century, and others such as the Kandariya Mahadev Temple at Khajuraho, the parts and the whole have the same character, with fractal dimension in the range 1.7 to 1.8. The cluster of smaller towers (shikhara, lit. 'mountain') about the tallest, central, tower which represents the holy Mount Kailash, abode of Lord Shiva, depicts the endless repetition of universes in Hindu cosmology. The religious studies scholar William J. Jackson observed of the pattern of towers grouped among smaller towers, themselves grouped among still smaller towers, that:

The ideal form gracefully artificed suggests the infinite rising levels of existence and consciousness, expanding sizes rising toward transcendence above, and at the same time housing the sacred deep within.

The Meenakshi Amman Temple is a large complex with multiple shrines, with the streets of Madurai laid out concentrically around it according to the shastras. The four gateways are tall towers (gopurams) with fractal-like repetitive structure as at Hampi. The enclosures around each shrine are rectangular and surrounded by high stone walls.

=== Ancient Greece ===
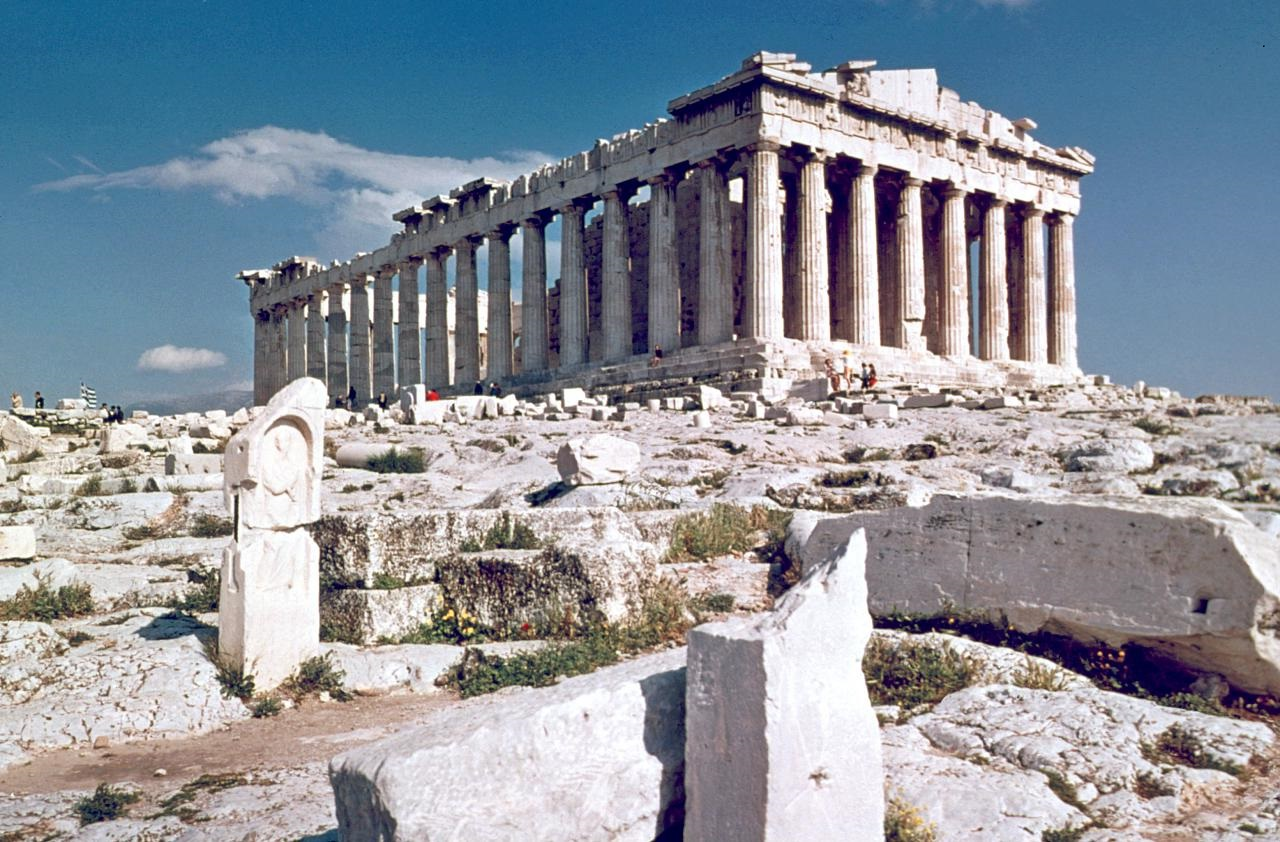
The Parthenon was designed using Pythagorean ratios.

Pythagoras (c. 569 – c. 475 B.C.) and his followers, the Pythagoreans, held that "all things are numbers". They observed the harmonies produced by notes with specific small-integer ratios of frequency, and argued that buildings too should be designed with such ratios. The Greek word symmetria originally denoted the harmony of architectural shapes in precise ratios from a building's smallest details right up to its entire design.

The Parthenon is 69.5 metres (228 ft) long, 30.9 metres (101 ft) wide and 13.7 metres (45 ft) high to the cornice. This gives a ratio of width to length of 4:9, and the same for height to width. Putting these together gives height:width:length of 16:36:81, or to the delight of the Pythagoreans 4^{2}:6^{2}:9^{2}. This sets the module as 0.858 m. A 4:9 rectangle can be constructed as three contiguous rectangles with sides in the ratio 3:4. Each half-rectangle is then a convenient 3:4:5 right triangle, enabling the angles and sides to be checked with a suitably knotted rope. The inner area (naos) similarly has 4:9 proportions (21.44 metres (70.3 ft) wide by 48.3 m long); the ratio between the diameter of the outer columns, 1.905 metres (6.25 ft), and the spacing of their centres, 4.293 metres (14.08 ft), is also 4:9.

Floor plan of the Parthenon

The Parthenon is considered by authors such as John Julius Norwich "the most perfect Doric temple ever built". Its elaborate architectural refinements include "a subtle correspondence between the curvature of the stylobate, the taper of the naos walls and the entasis of the columns". Entasis refers to the subtle diminution in diameter of the columns as they rise. The stylobate is the platform on which the columns stand. As in other classical Greek temples, the platform has a slight parabolic upward curvature to shed rainwater and reinforce the building against earthquakes. The columns might therefore be supposed to lean outwards, but they actually lean slightly inwards so that if they carried on, they would meet about a kilometre and a half above the centre of the building; since they are all the same height, the curvature of the outer stylobate edge is transmitted to the architrave and roof above: "all follow the rule of being built to delicate curves".

The golden ratio was known in 300 B.C., when Euclid described the method of geometric construction. It has been argued that the golden ratio was used in the design of the Parthenon and other ancient Greek buildings, as well as sculptures, paintings, and vases. More recent authors such as Nikos Salingaros, however, doubt all these claims. Experiments by the computer scientist George Markowsky failed to find any preference for the golden rectangle.

=== Islamic architecture ===
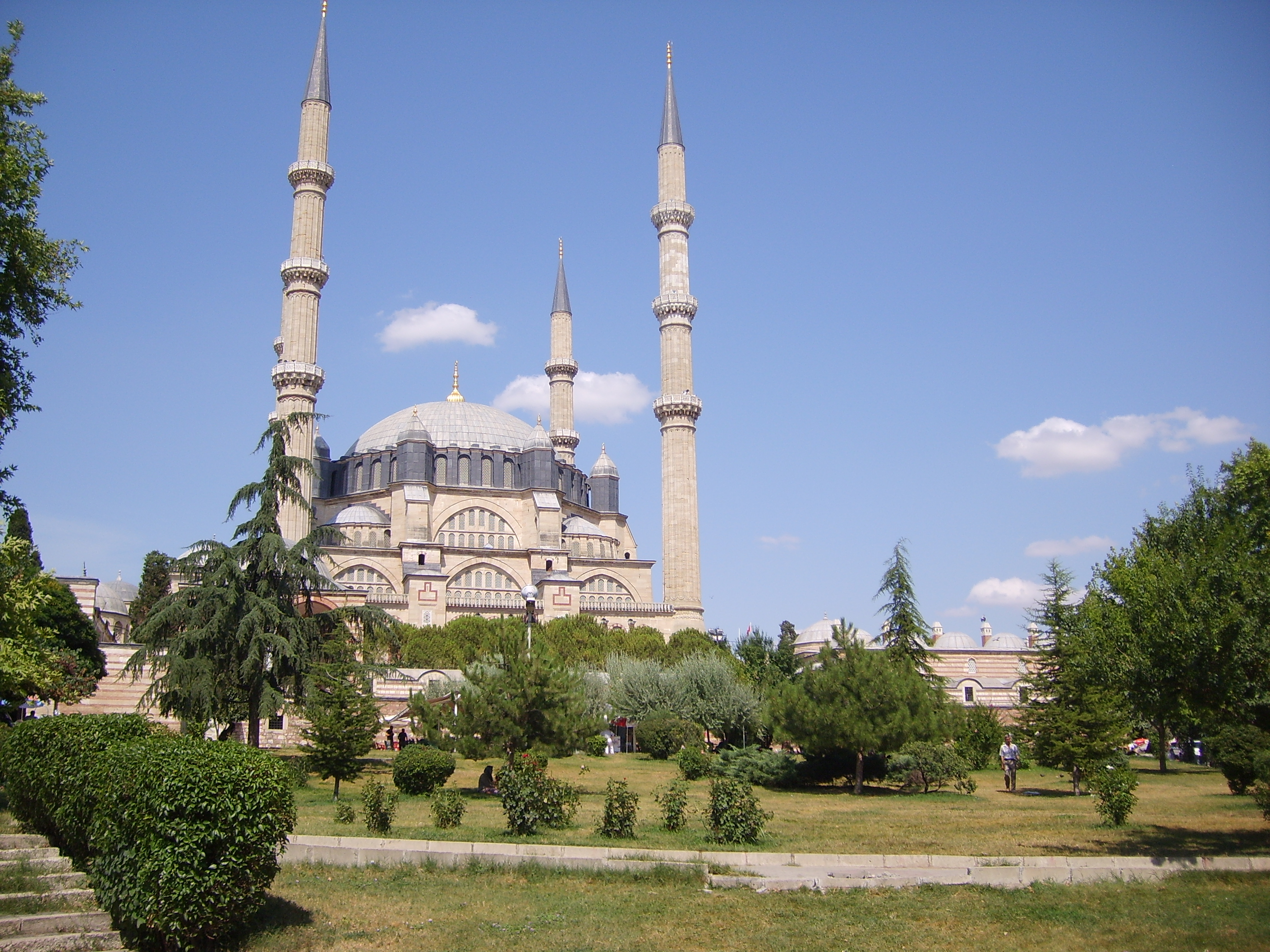
Selimiye Mosque, Edirne, 1569–1575

The historian of Islamic art Antonio Fernandez-Puertas suggests that the Alhambra, like the Great Mosque of Cordoba, was designed using the Hispano-Muslim foot or codo of about 0.62 metres (2.0 ft). In the palace's Court of the Lions, the proportions follow a series of surds. A rectangle with sides 1 and √2 has (by Pythagoras's theorem) a diagonal of √3, which describes the right triangle made by the sides of the court; the series continues with √4 (giving a 1:2 ratio), √5 and so on. The decorative patterns are similarly proportioned, √2 generating squares inside circles and eight-pointed stars, √3 generating six-pointed stars. There is no evidence to support earlier claims that the golden ratio was used in the Alhambra. The Court of the Lions is bracketed by the Hall of Two Sisters and the Hall of the Abencerrajes; a regular hexagon can be drawn from the centres of these two halls and the four inside corners of the Court of the Lions.

The Selimiye Mosque in Edirne, Turkey, was built by Mimar Sinan to provide a space where the mihrab could be seen from anywhere inside the building. The very large central space is accordingly arranged as an octagon, formed by eight enormous pillars, and capped by a circular dome of 31.25 metres (102.5 ft) diameter and 43 metres (141 ft) high. The octagon is formed into a square with four semidomes, and externally by four exceptionally tall minarets, 83 metres (272 ft) tall. The building's plan is thus a circle, inside an octagon, inside a square.

=== Mughal architecture ===
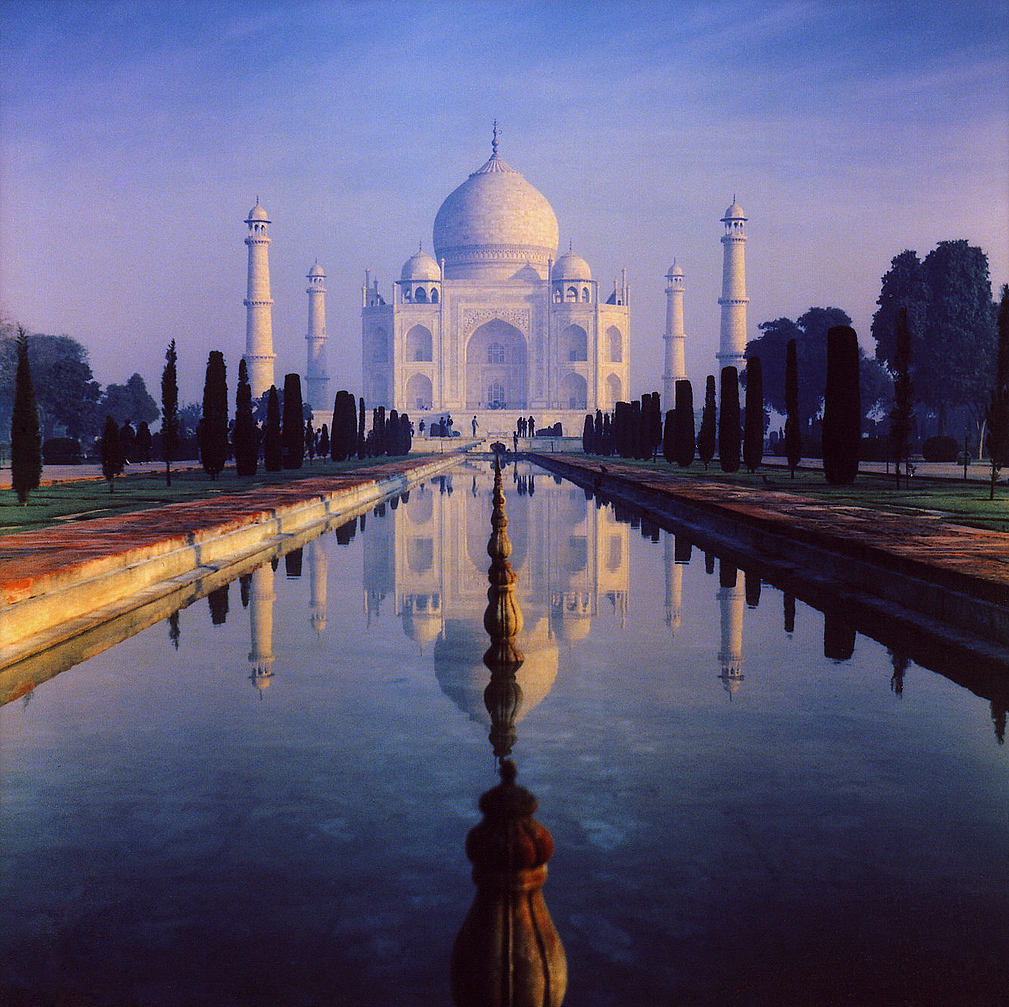
The Taj Mahal mausoleum with part of the complex's gardens at Agra

Mughal architecture, as seen in the abandoned imperial city of Fatehpur Sikri and the Taj Mahal complex, has a distinctive mathematical order and a strong aesthetic based on symmetry and harmony.

The Taj Mahal exemplifies Mughal architecture, both representing paradise and displaying the Mughal Emperor Shah Jahan's power through its scale, symmetry and costly decoration. The white marble mausoleum, decorated with pietra dura, the great gate (Darwaza-i rauza), other buildings, the gardens and paths together form a unified hierarchical design. The buildings include a mosque in red sandstone on the west, and an almost identical building, the Jawab or 'answer' on the east to maintain the bilateral symmetry of the complex. The formal charbagh ('fourfold garden') is in four parts, symbolising the four rivers of Paradise, and offering views and reflections of the mausoleum. These are divided in turn into 16 parterres.

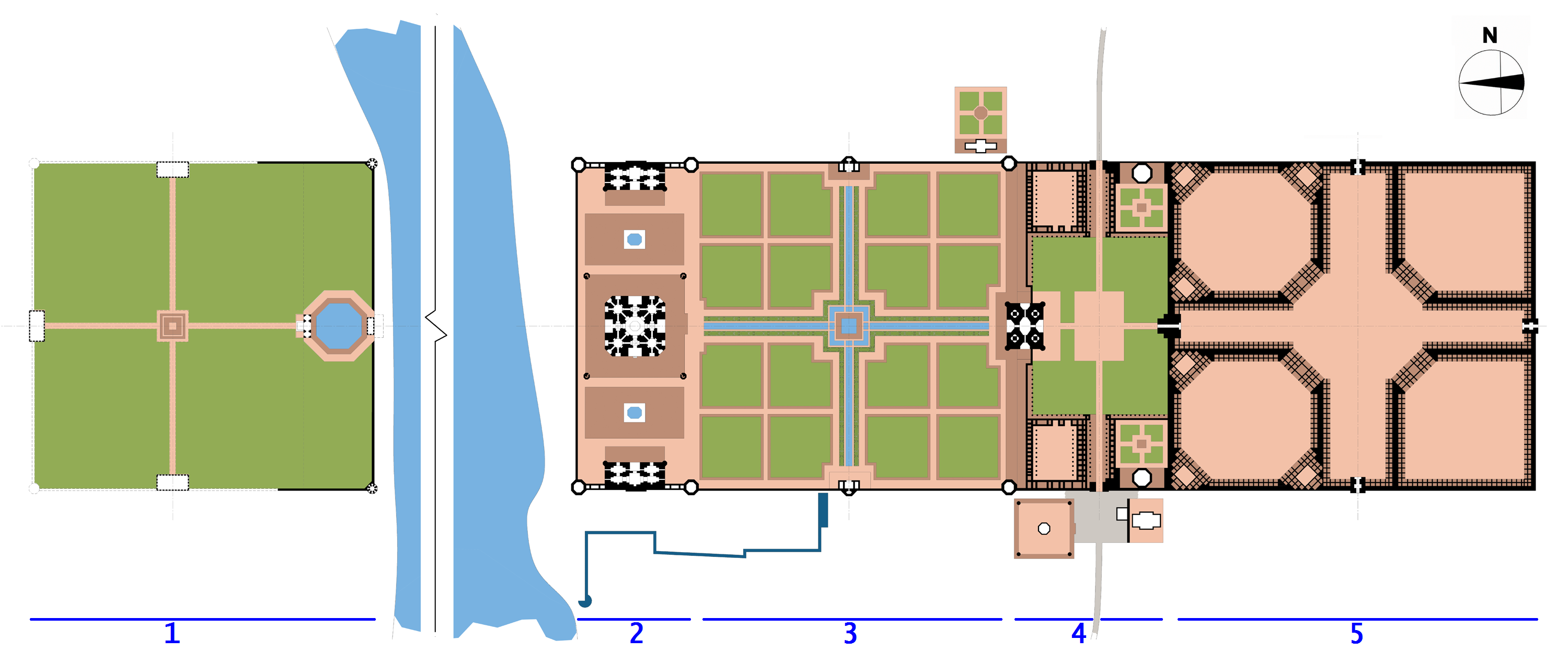
Site plan of the Taj Mahal complex. The great gate is at the right, the mausoleum in the centre, bracketed by the mosque (below) and the jawab. The plan includes squares and octagons.

The Taj Mahal complex was laid out on a grid, subdivided into smaller grids. The historians of architecture Koch and Barraud agree with the traditional accounts that give the width of the complex as 374 Mughal yards or gaz, (Note: 1 gaz is about 0.86 metres (2.8 ft).) the main area being three 374-gaz squares. These were divided in areas like the bazaar and caravanserai into 17-gaz modules; the garden and terraces are in modules of 23 gaz, and are 368 gaz wide (16 x 23). The mausoleum, mosque and guest house are laid out on a grid of 7 gaz. Koch and Barraud observe that if an octagon, used repeatedly in the complex, is given sides of 7 units, then it has a width of 17 units, (Note: A square drawn around the octagon by prolonging alternate sides adds four right angle triangles with hypotenuse of 7 and the other two sides of √49/2 or 4.9497..., nearly 5. The side of the square is thus 5+7+5, which is 17.) which may help to explain the choice of ratios in the complex.

=== Christian architecture ===
The Christian patriarchal basilica of Haghia Sophia in Byzantium (now Istanbul), first constructed in 537 (and twice rebuilt), was for a thousand years (Note: Until Seville Cathedral was completed in 1520.) the largest cathedral ever built. It inspired many later buildings including Sultan Ahmed and other mosques in the city. The Byzantine architecture includes a nave crowned by a circular dome and two half-domes, all of the same diameter (31 metres (102 ft)), with a further five smaller half-domes forming an apse and four rounded corners of a vast rectangular interior. This was interpreted by mediaeval architects as representing the mundane below (the square base) and the divine heavens above (the soaring spherical dome). The emperor Justinian used two geometers, Isidore of Miletus and Anthemius of Tralles as architects; Isidore compiled the works of Archimedes on solid geometry, and was influenced by him.

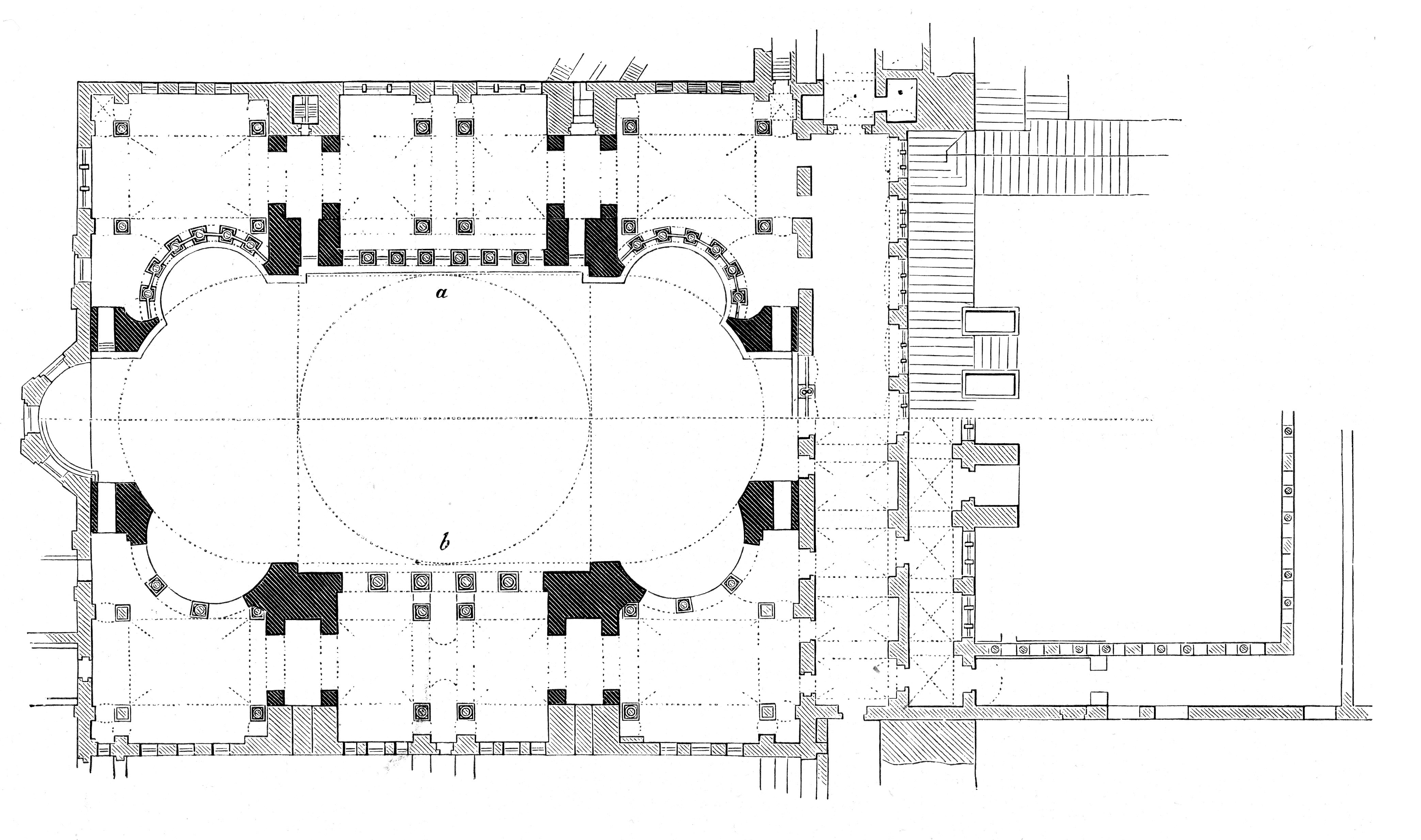
Haghia Sophia, Istanbul a) Plan of gallery (upper half) b) Plan of the ground floor (lower half)

The importance of water baptism in Christianity was reflected in the scale of baptistry architecture. The oldest, the Lateran Baptistry in Rome, built in 440, set a trend for octagonal baptistries; the baptismal font inside these buildings was often octagonal, though Italy's largest baptistry, at Pisa, built between 1152 and 1363, is circular, with an octagonal font. It is 54.86 metres (180.0 ft) high, with a diameter of 34.13 metres (112.0 ft) (a ratio of 8:5). Saint Ambrose wrote that fonts and baptistries were octagonal "because on the eighth day, (Note: The sixth day of Holy Week was Good Friday; the following Sunday (of the resurrection) was thus the eighth day.) by rising, Christ loosens the bondage of death and receives the dead from their graves." Saint Augustine similarly described the eighth day as "everlasting ... hallowed by the resurrection of Christ". The octagonal Baptistry of Saint John, Florence, built between 1059 and 1128, is one of the oldest buildings in that city, and one of the last in the direct tradition of classical antiquity; it was extremely influential in the subsequent Florentine Renaissance, as major architects including Francesco Talenti, Alberti and Brunelleschi used it as the model of classical architecture.

The number five is used "exuberantly" in the 1721 Pilgrimage Church of St John of Nepomuk at Zelená hora, near Žďár nad Sázavou in the Czech republic, designed by Jan Blažej Santini Aichel. The nave is circular, surrounded by five pairs of columns and five oval domes alternating with ogival apses. The church further has five gates, five chapels, five altars and five stars; a legend claims that when Saint John of Nepomuk was martyred, five stars appeared over his head. The fivefold architecture may also symbolise the five wounds of Christ and the five letters of "Tacui" (Latin: "I kept silence" [about secrets of the confessional]).

Antoni Gaudí used a wide variety of geometric structures, some being minimal surfaces, in the Sagrada Família, Barcelona, started in 1882 (and not completed as of 2023). These include hyperbolic paraboloids and hyperboloids of revolution, tessellations, catenary arches, catenoids, helicoids, and ruled surfaces. This varied mix of geometries is creatively combined in different ways around the church. For example, in the Passion Façade of Sagrada Família, Gaudí assembled stone "branches" in the form of hyperbolic paraboloids, which overlap at their tops (directrices) without, therefore, meeting at a point. In contrast, in the colonnade there are hyperbolic paraboloidal surfaces that smoothly join other structures to form unbounded surfaces. Further, Gaudí exploits natural patterns, themselves mathematical, with columns derived from the shapes of trees, and lintels made from unmodified basalt naturally cracked (by cooling from molten rock) into hexagonal columns.

The 1971 Cathedral of Saint Mary of the Assumption, San Francisco has a saddle roof composed of eight segments of hyperbolic paraboloids, arranged so that the bottom horizontal cross section of the roof is a square and the top cross section is a Christian cross. The building is a square 77.7 metres (255 ft) on a side, and 57.9 metres (190 ft) high. The 1970 Cathedral of Brasília by Oscar Niemeyer makes a different use of a hyperboloid structure; it is constructed from 16 identical concrete beams, each weighing 90 tonnes, (Note: This is 90 tonnes (89 long tons; 99 short tons).) arranged in a circle to form a hyperboloid of revolution, the white beams creating a shape like hands praying to heaven. Only the dome is visible from outside: most of the building is below ground.

Several medieval churches in Scandinavia are circular, including four on the Danish island of Bornholm. One of the oldest of these, Østerlars Church from c. 1160, has a circular nave around a massive circular stone column, pierced with arches and decorated with a fresco. The circular structure has three storeys and was apparently fortified, the top storey having served for defence.

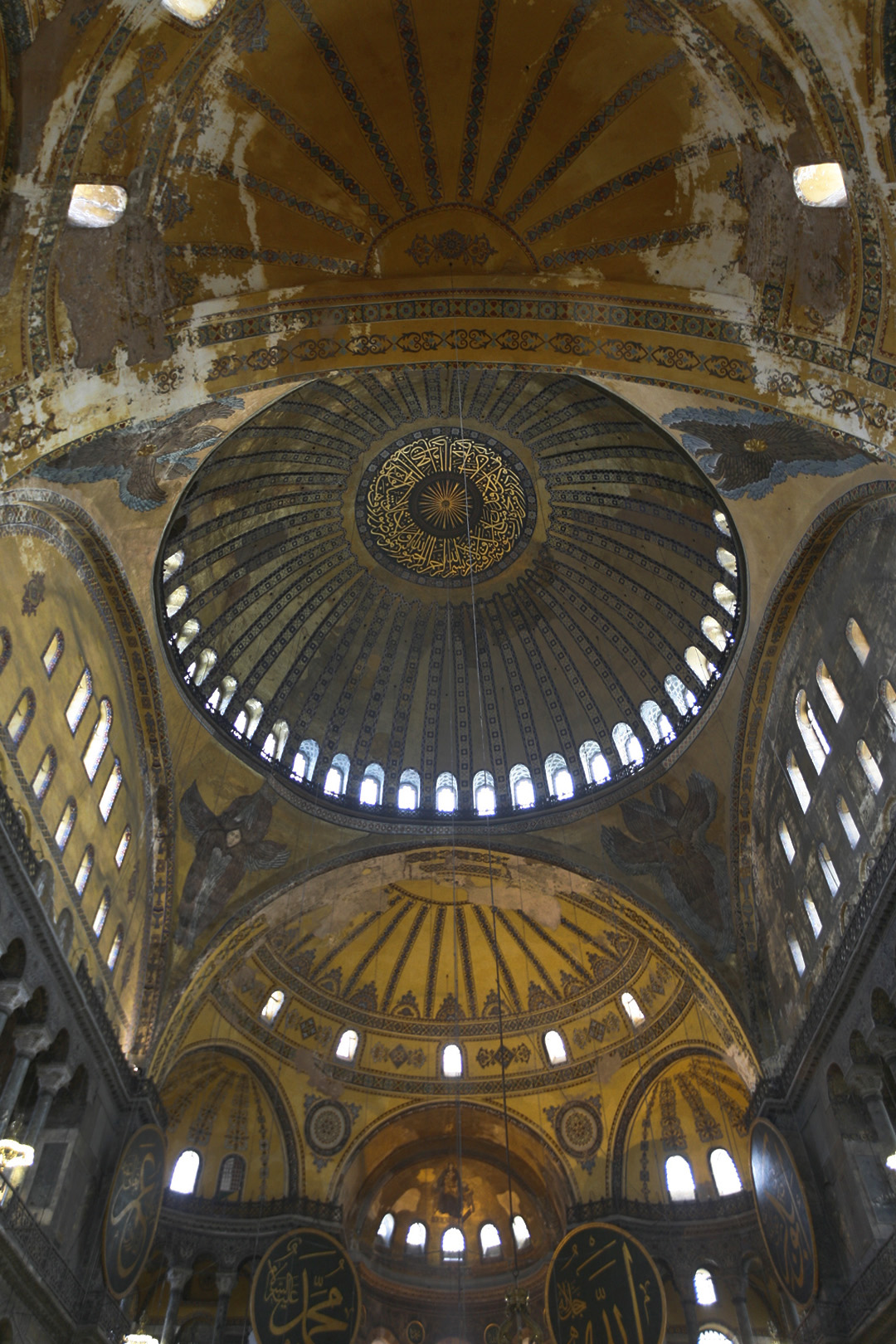
The vaulting of the nave of Haghia Sophia, Istanbul (annotations), 562

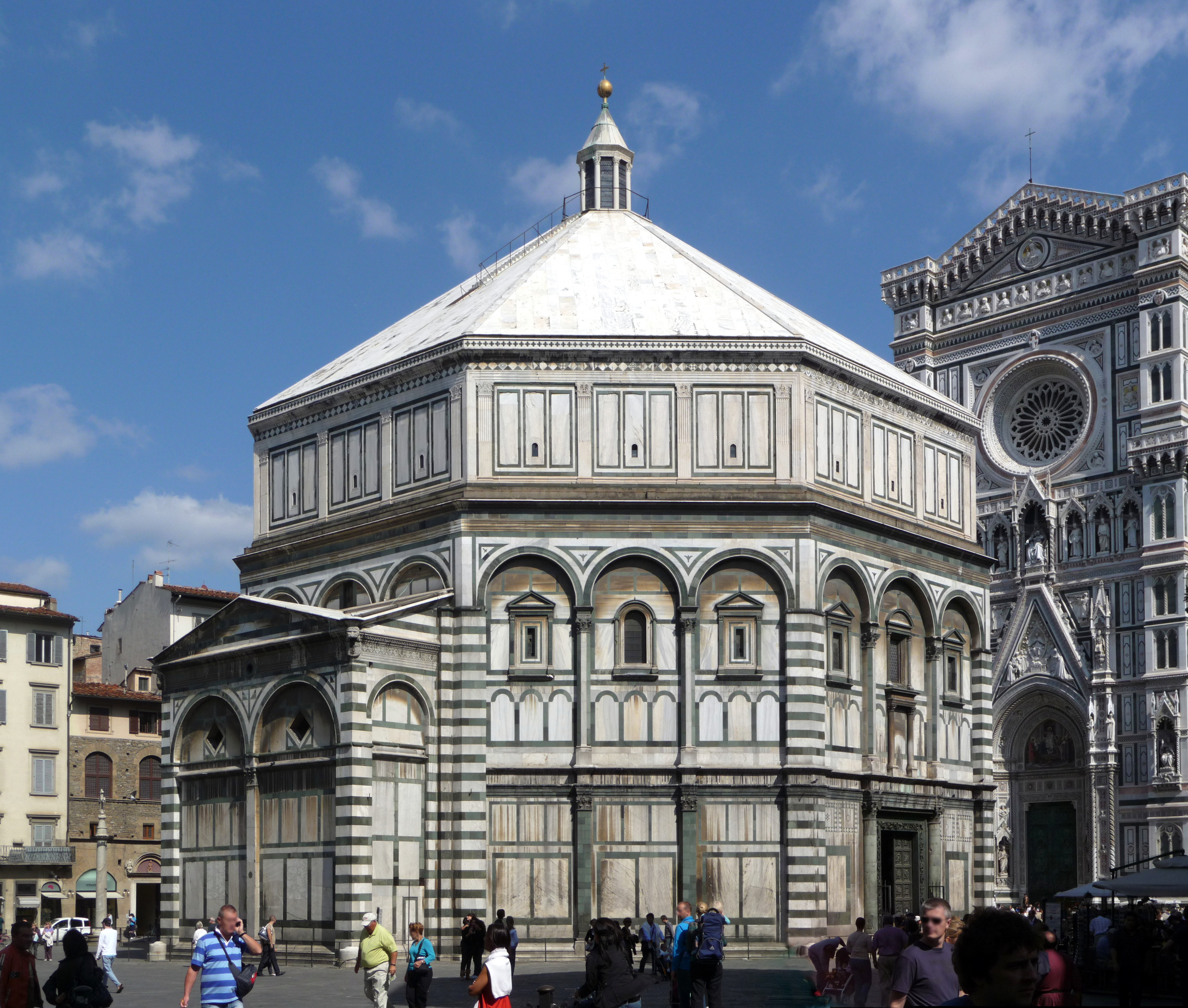
The octagonal Baptistry of Saint John, Florence, completed in 1128

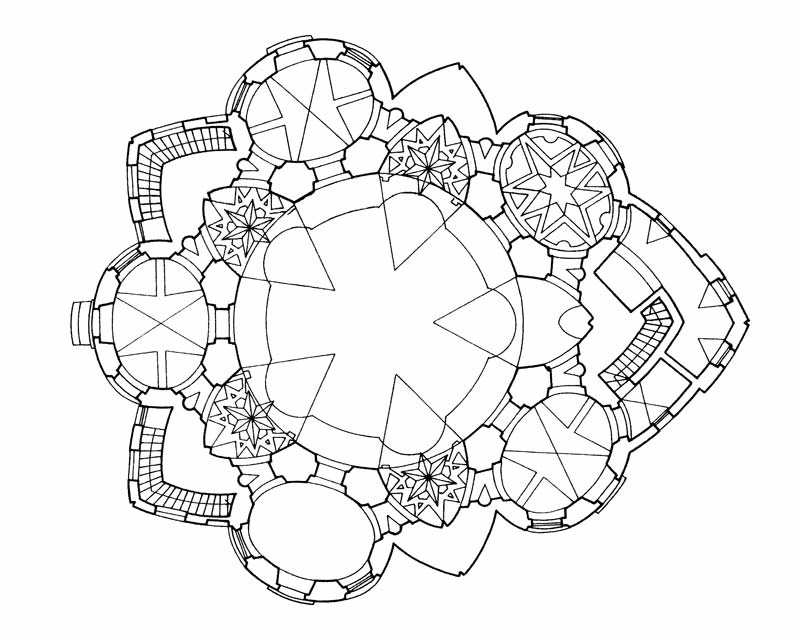
Fivefold symmetries: Jan Santini Aichel's Pilgrimage Church of St John of Nepomuk at Zelená hora, 1721

Passion façade of Antoni Gaudí's Sagrada Família, Barcelona, started 1882

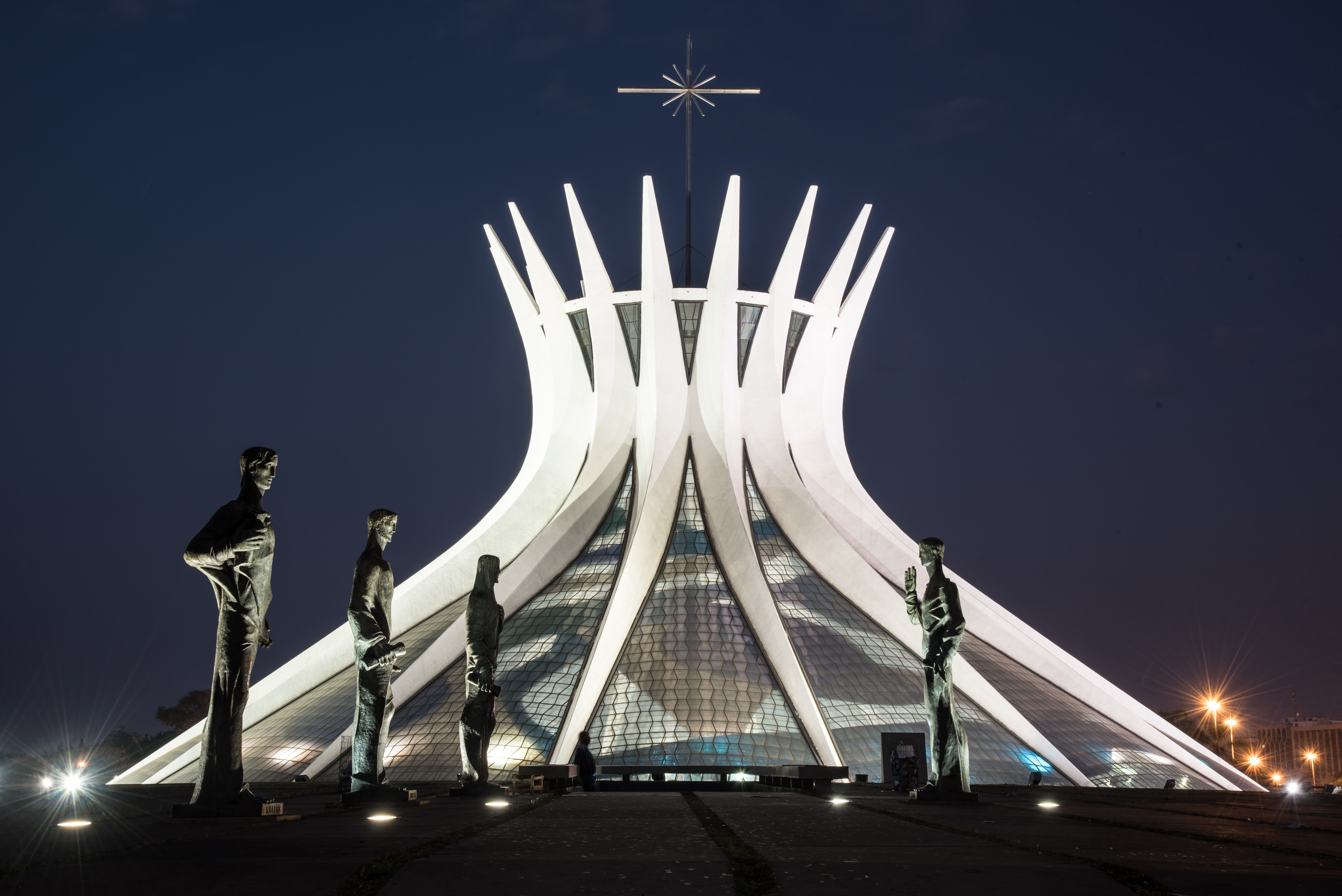
Oscar Niemeyer's Cathedral of Brasília, 1970

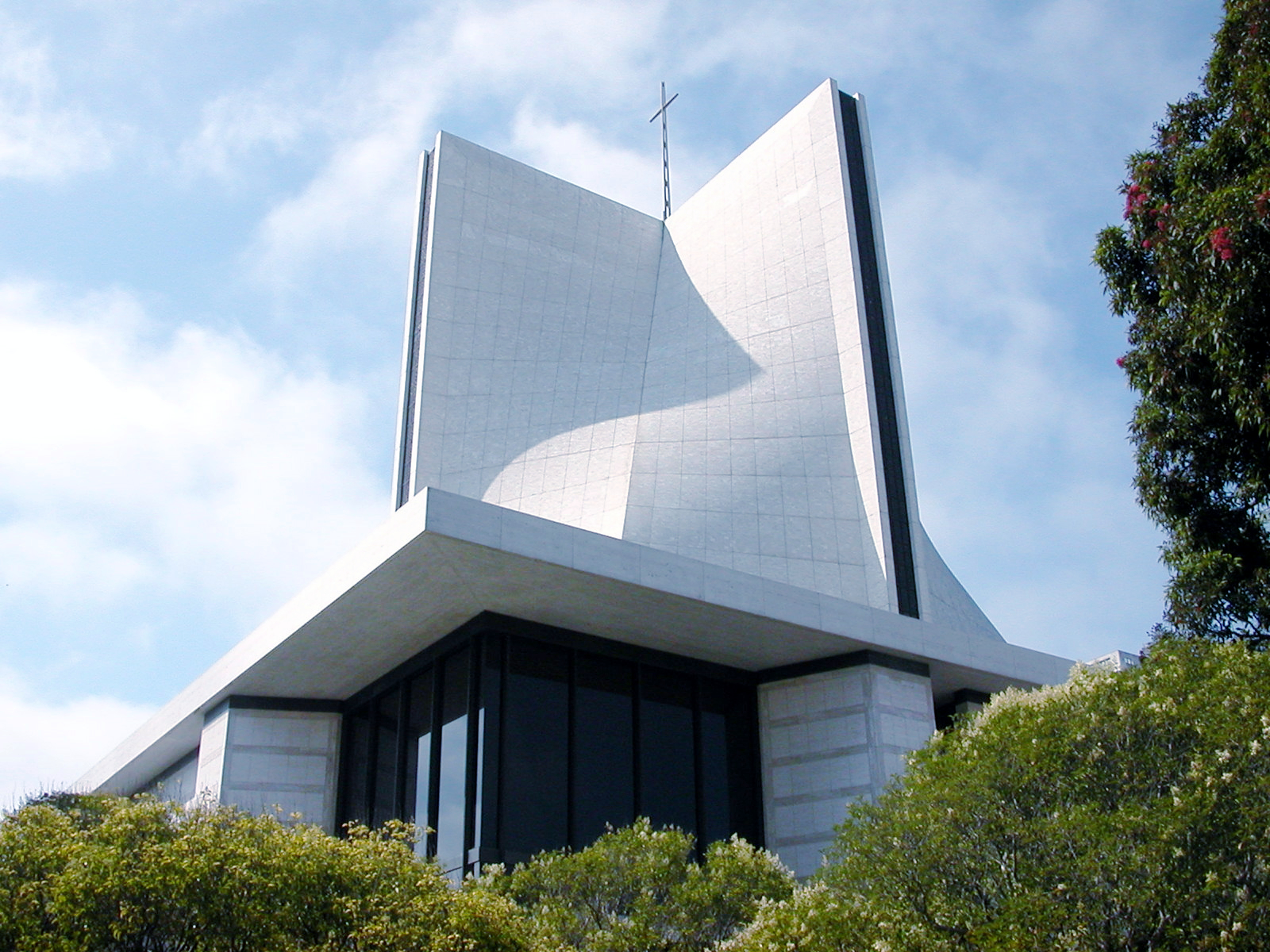
The Cathedral of Saint Mary of the Assumption, San Francisco, 1971

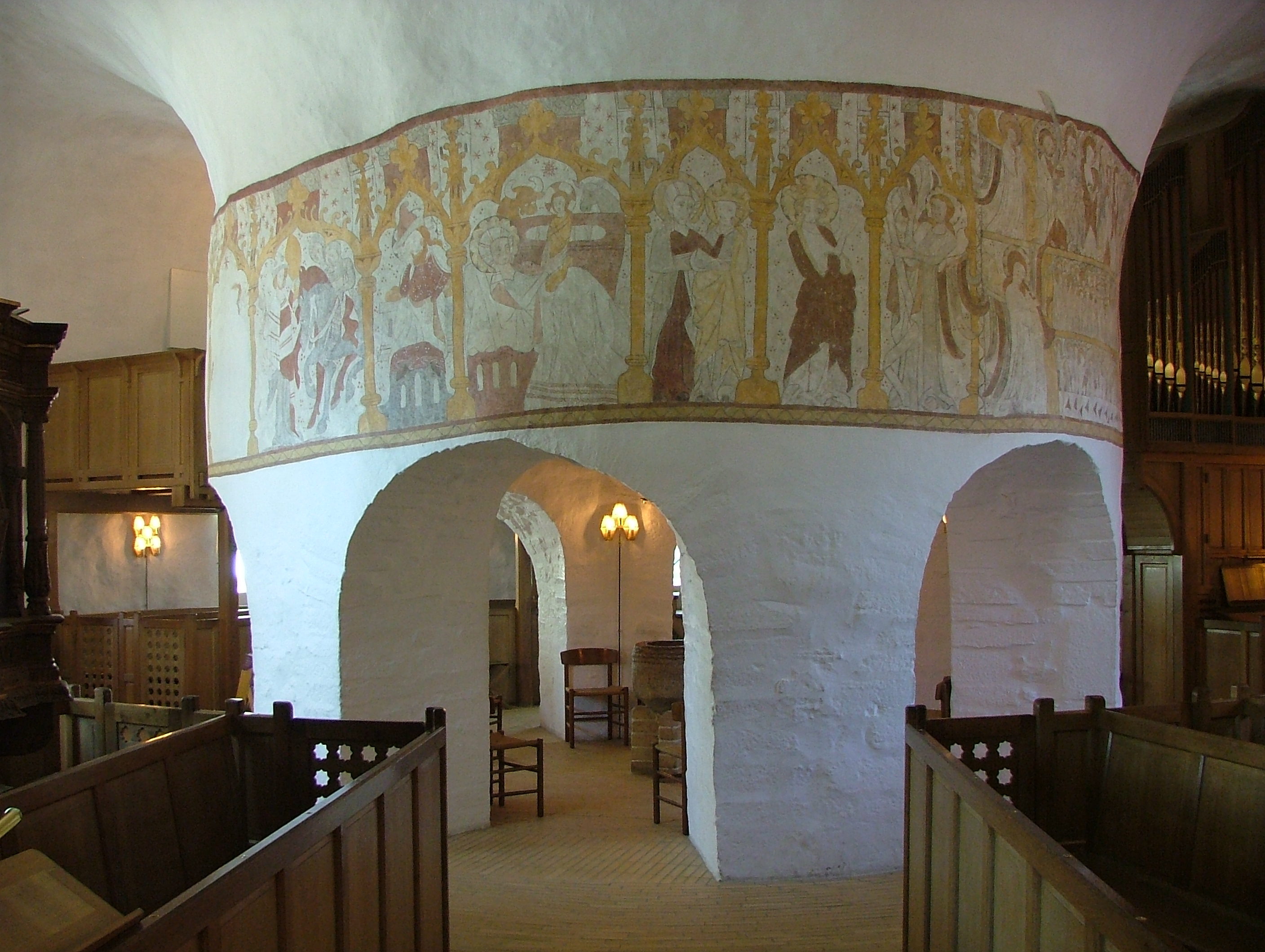
Central column of Østerlars Nordic round church in Bornholm, Denmark

== Mathematical decoration ==
=== Islamic architectural decoration ===
Islamic buildings are often decorated with geometric patterns which typically make use of several mathematical tessellations, formed of ceramic tiles (girih, zellige) that may themselves be plain or decorated with stripes. Symmetries such as stars with six, eight, or multiples of eight points are used in Islamic patterns. Some of these are based on the "Khatem Sulemani" or Solomon's seal motif, which is an eight-pointed star made of two squares, one rotated 45 degrees from the other on the same centre. Islamic patterns exploit many of the 17 possible wallpaper groups; as early as 1944, Edith Müller showed that the Alhambra made use of 11 wallpaper groups in its decorations, while in 1986 Branko Grünbaum claimed to have found 13 wallpaper groups in the Alhambra, asserting controversially that the remaining four groups are not found anywhere in Islamic ornament.

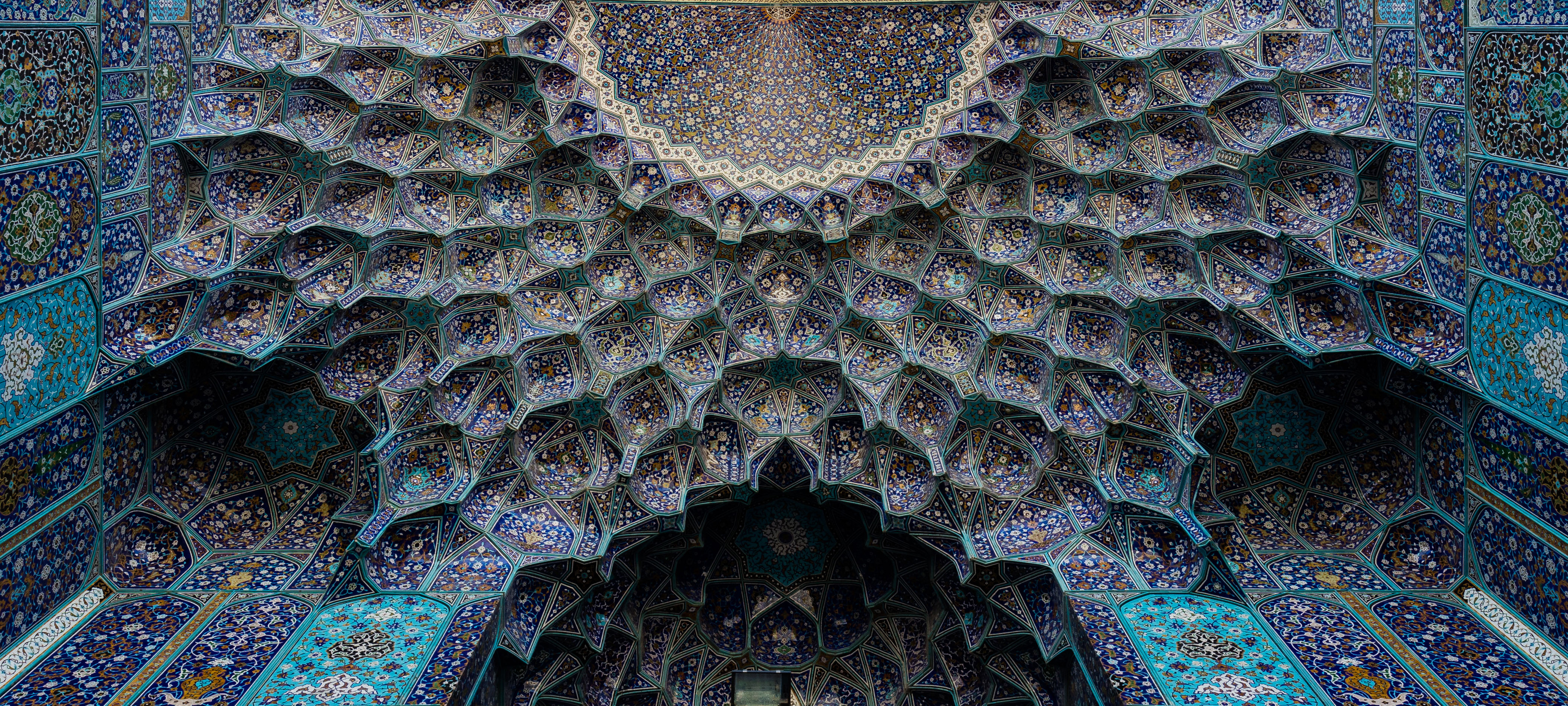
The complex geometry and tilings of the muqarnas vaulting in the Sheikh Lotfollah Mosque, Isfahan, 1603–1619

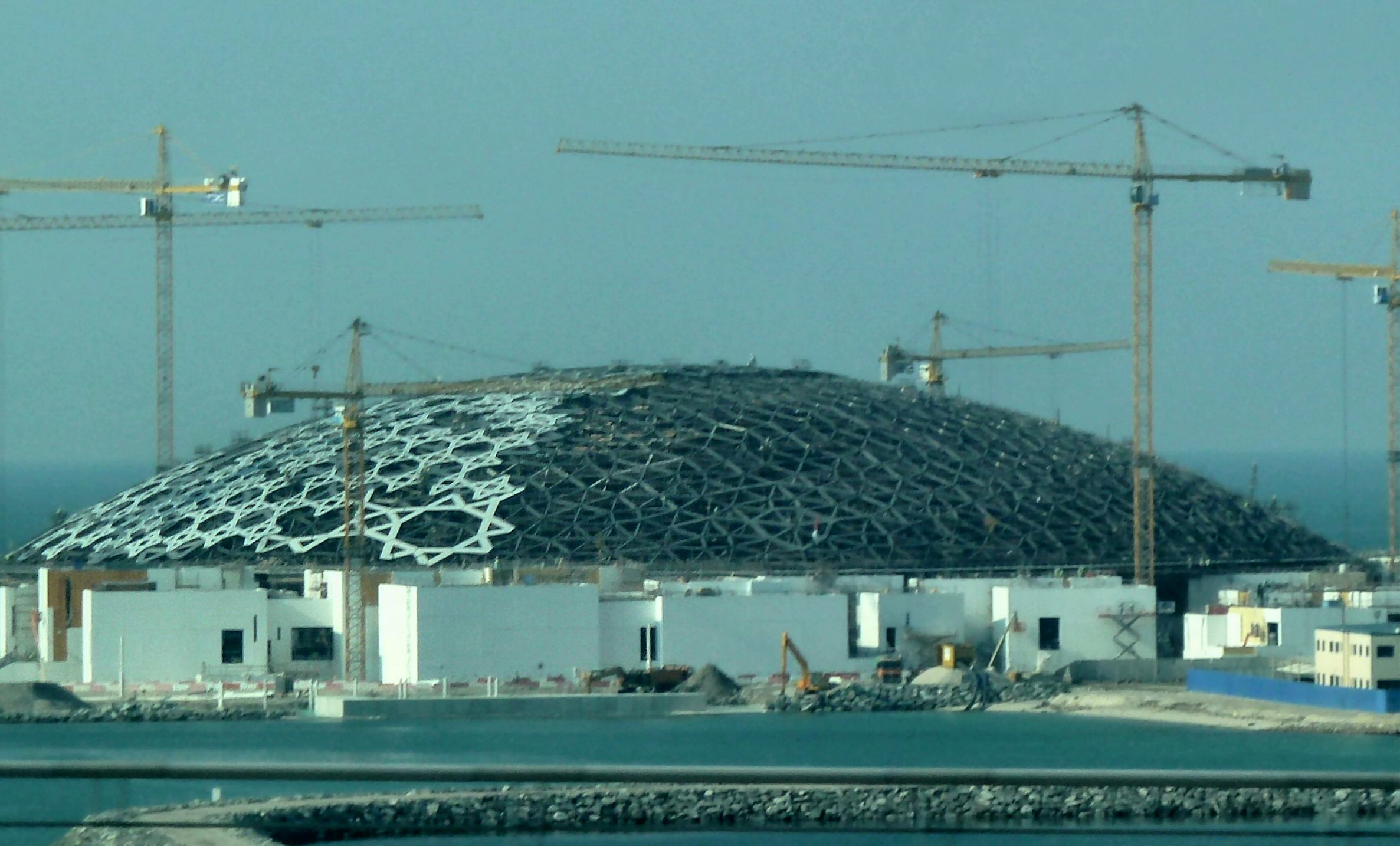
Louvre Abu Dhabi under construction in 2015, its dome built up of layers of stars made of octagons, triangles, and squares

=== Modern architectural decoration ===
Towards the end of the 20th century, novel mathematical constructs such as fractal geometry and aperiodic tiling were seized upon by architects to provide interesting and attractive coverings for buildings. In 1913, the Modernist architect Adolf Loos had declared that "Ornament is a crime", influencing architectural thinking for the rest of the 20th century. In the 21st century, architects are again starting to explore the use of ornament. 21st century ornamentation is extremely diverse. Henning Larsen's 2011 Harpa Concert and Conference Centre, Reykjavik has what looks like a crystal wall of rock made of large blocks of glass. Foreign Office Architects' 2010 Ravensbourne College, London is tessellated decoratively with 28,000 anodised aluminium tiles in red, white and brown, interlinking circular windows of differing sizes. The tessellation uses three types of tile, an equilateral triangle and two irregular pentagons. (Note: An aperiodic tiling was considered, to avoid the rhythm of a structural grid, but in practice a Penrose tiling was too complex, so a grid of 2.625m horizontally and 4.55m vertically was chosen.) Kazumi Kudo's Kanazawa Umimirai Library creates a decorative grid made of small circular blocks of glass set into plain concrete walls.

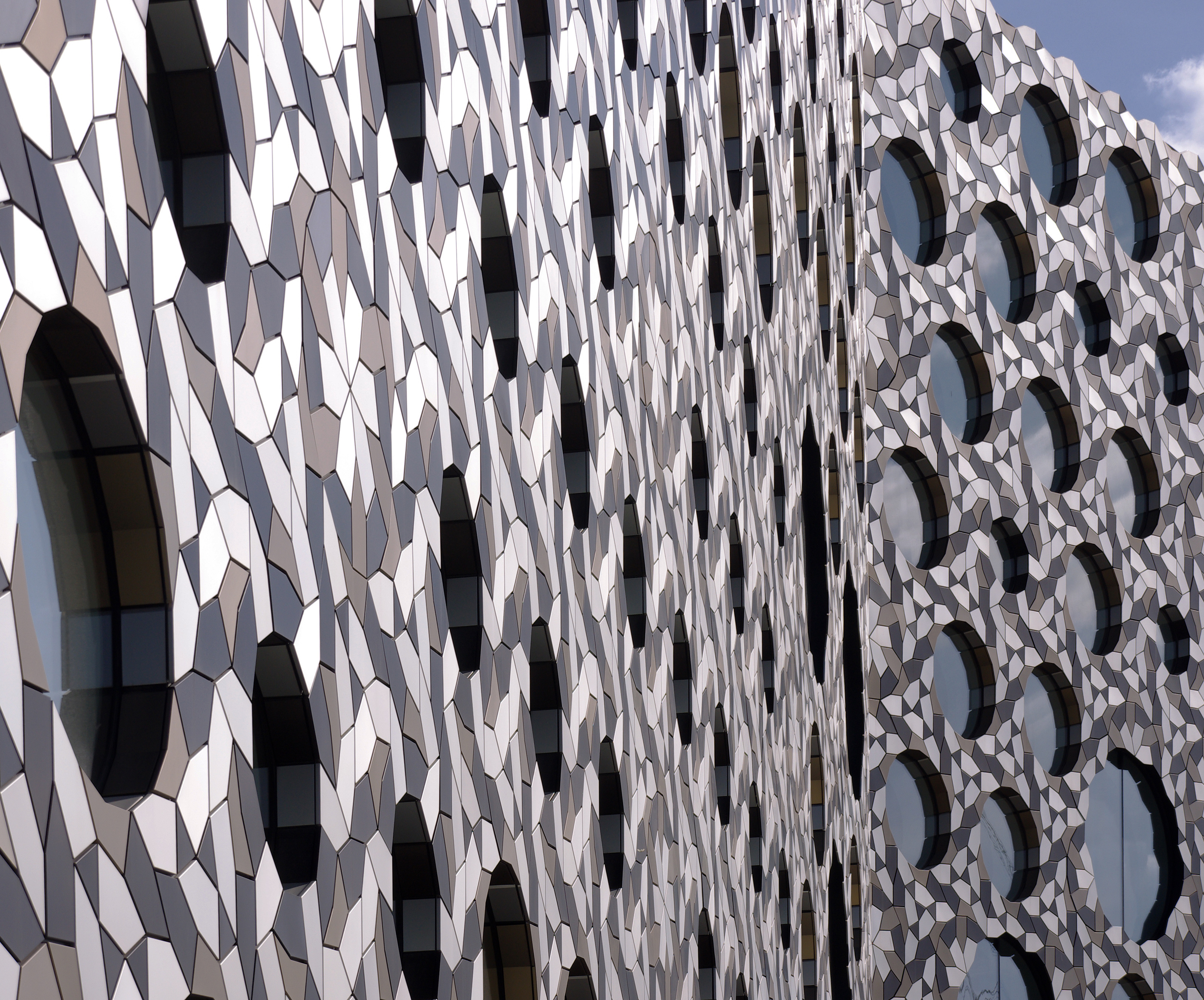
Ravensbourne College, London, 2010

Harpa Concert and Conference Centre, Iceland, 2011

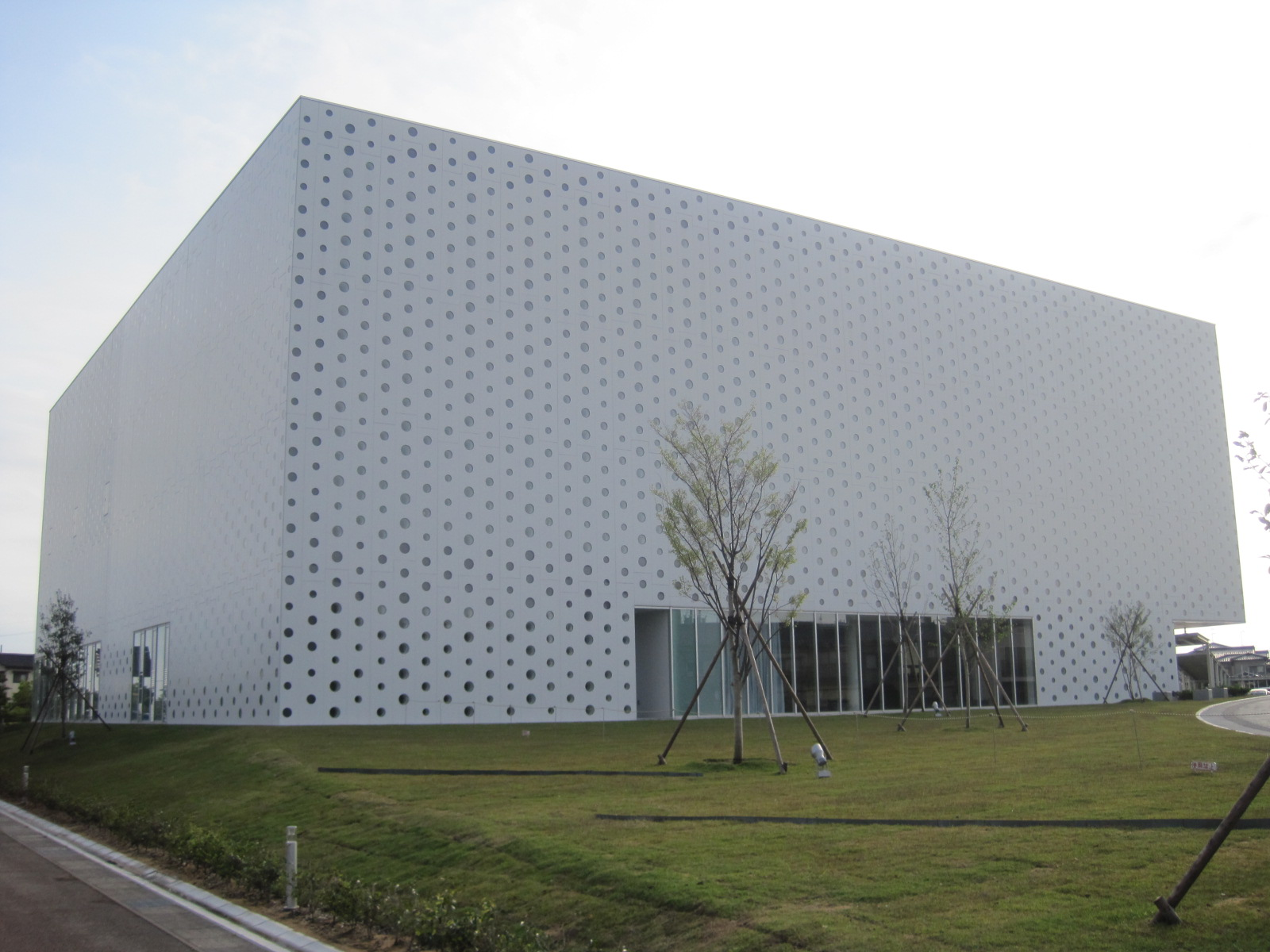
Kanazawa Umimirai Library, Japan, 2011

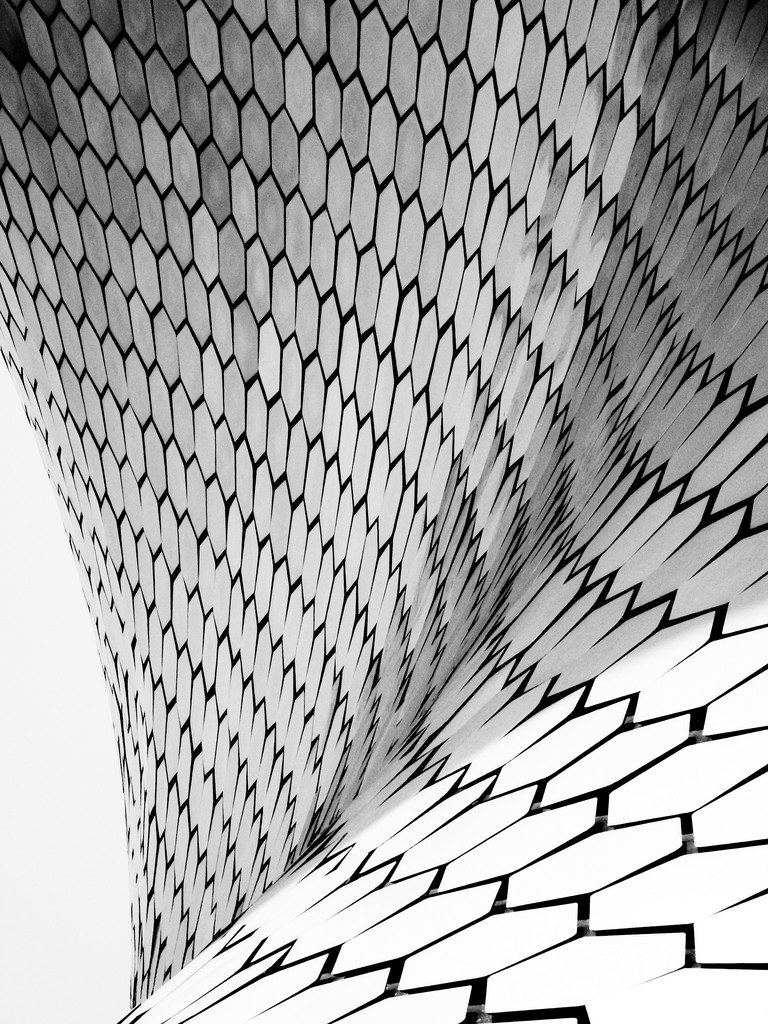
Museo Soumaya, México, 2011

== Defence ==
=== Europe ===
The architecture of fortifications evolved from medieval fortresses, which had high masonry walls, to low, symmetrical star forts able to resist artillery bombardment between the mid-fifteenth and nineteenth centuries. The geometry of the star shapes was dictated by the need to avoid dead zones where attacking infantry could shelter from defensive fire; the sides of the projecting points were angled to permit such fire to sweep the ground, and to provide crossfire (from both sides) beyond each projecting point. Well-known architects who designed such defences include Michelangelo, Baldassare Peruzzi, Vincenzo Scamozzi and Sébastien Le Prestre de Vauban.

The architectural historian Siegfried Giedion argued that the star-shaped fortification had a formative influence on the patterning of the Renaissance ideal city: "The Renaissance was hypnotized by one city type which for a century and a half—from Filarete to Scamozzi—was impressed upon all utopian schemes: this is the star-shaped city."

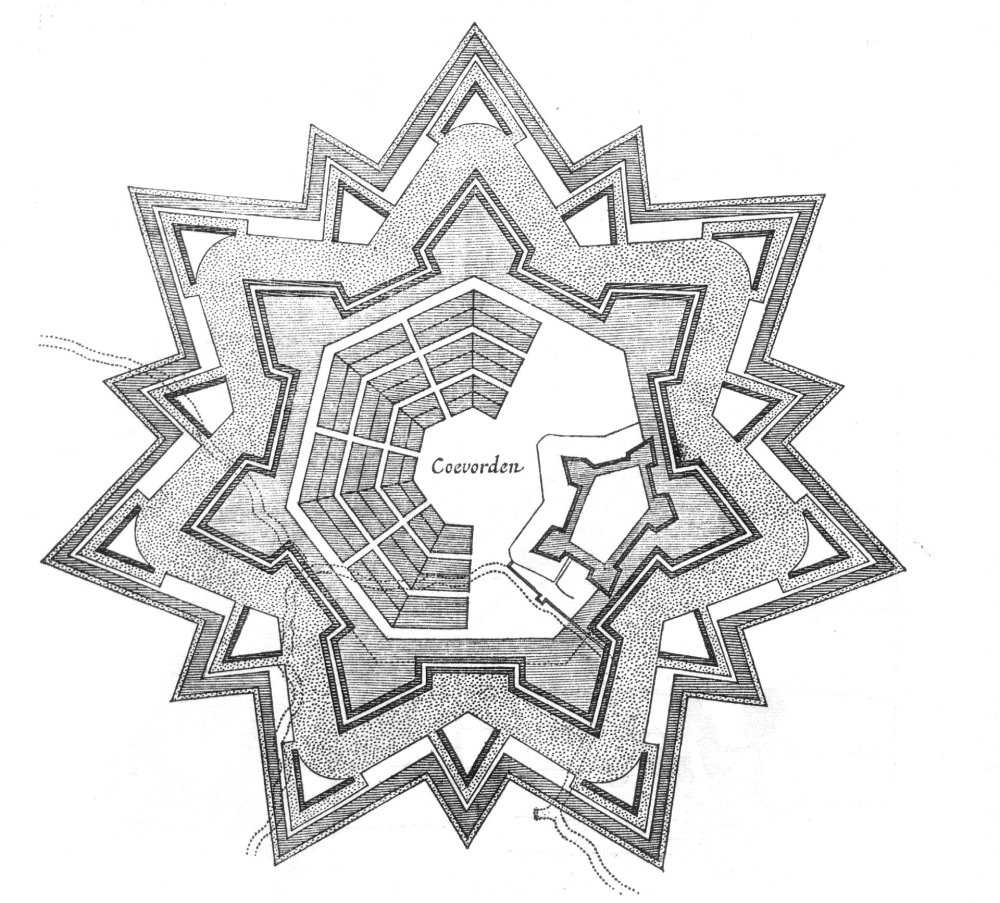
Coevorden fortification plan. 17th century

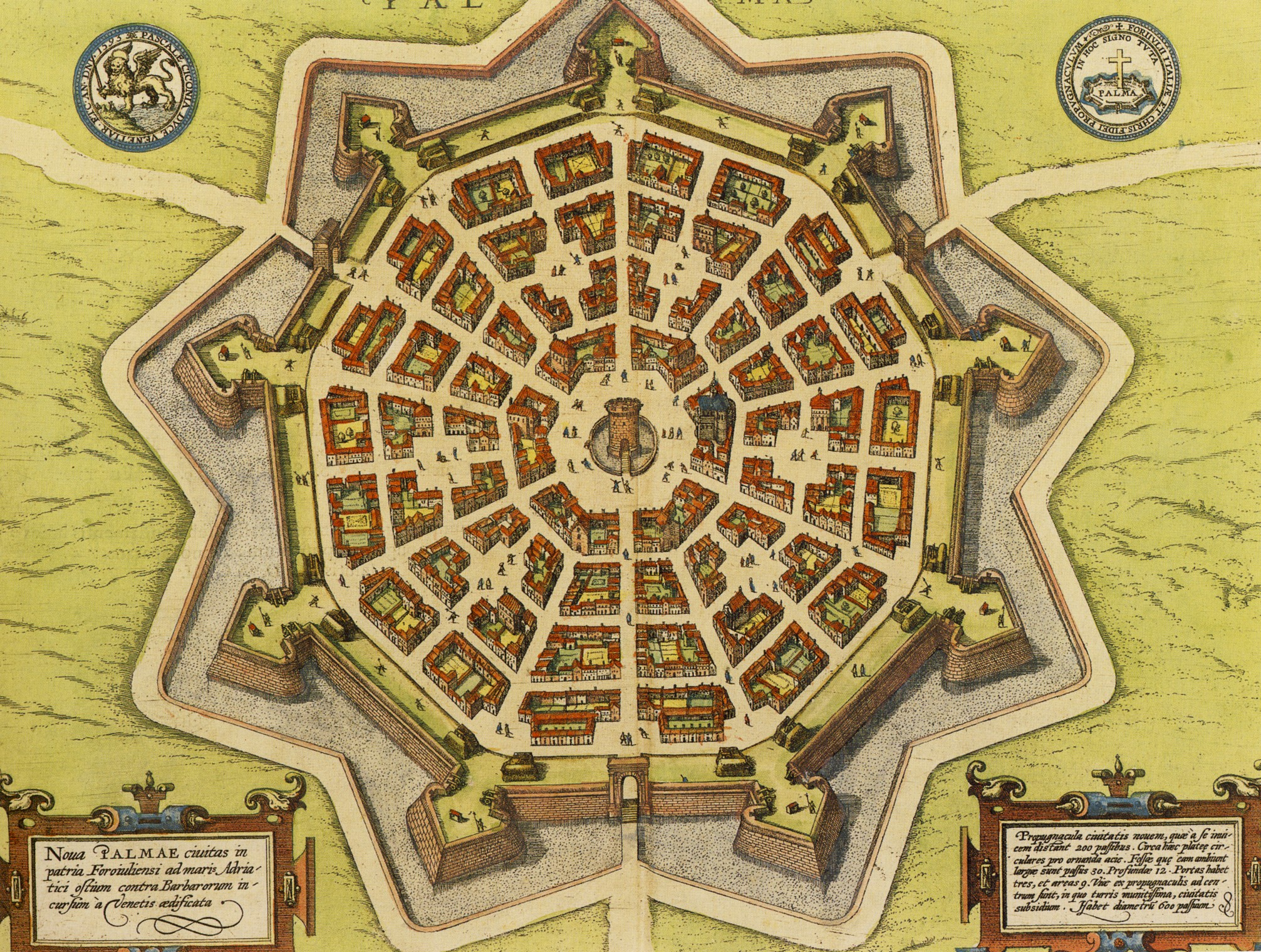
Palmanova, Italy, a Venetian city within a star fort. 17th century

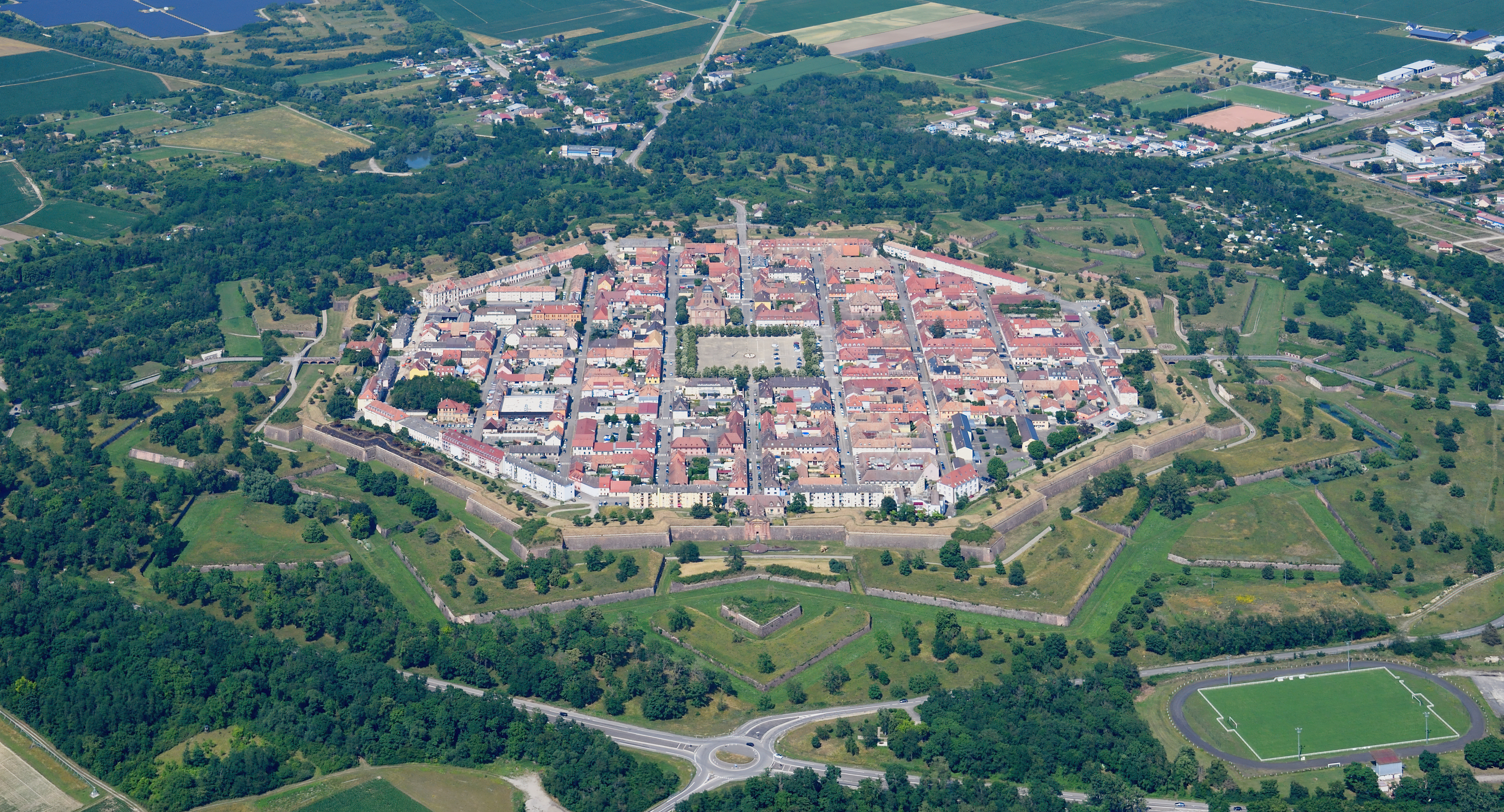
Neuf-Brisach, Alsace, one of the Fortifications of Vauban

=== China ===
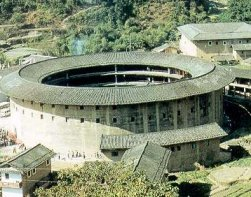
A tulou in Yongding County, Fujian province

In Chinese architecture, the tulou of Fujian province are circular, communal defensive structures with mainly blank walls and a single iron-plated wooden door, some dating back to the sixteenth century. The walls are topped with roofs that slope gently both outwards and inwards, forming a ring. The centre of the circle is an open cobbled courtyard, often with a well, surrounded by timbered galleries up to five stories high.

== Environmental goals ==
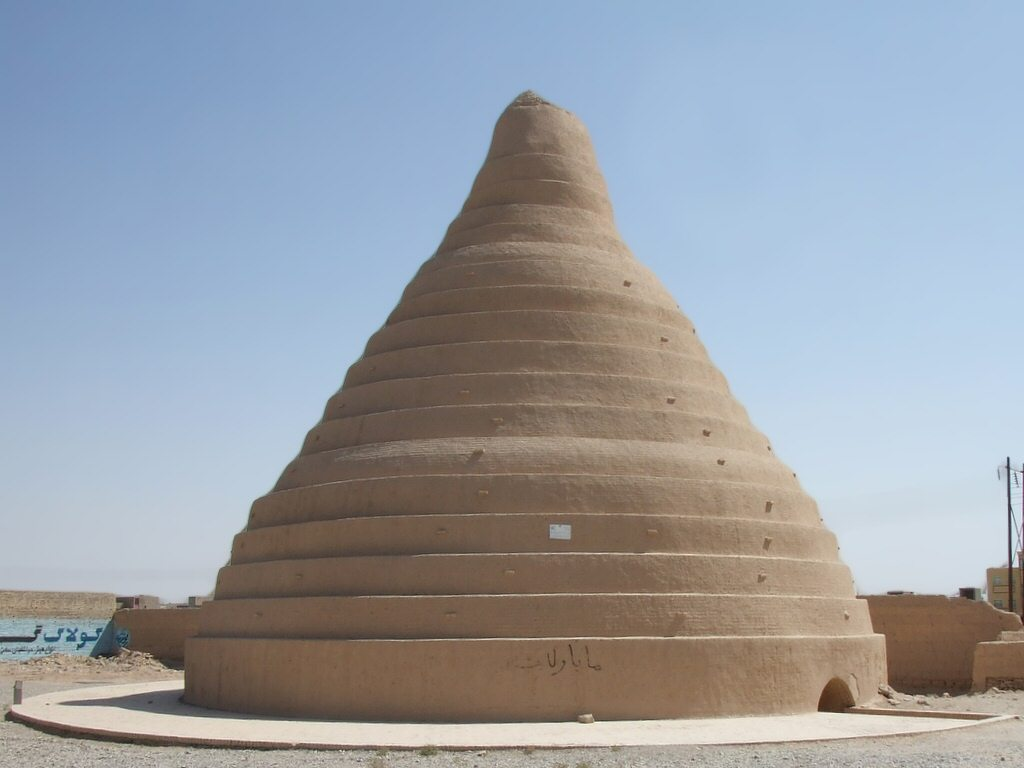
Yakhchal in Yazd, Iran

Architects may also select the form of a building to meet environmental goals. For example, Foster and Partners' 30 St Mary Axe, London, known as "The Gherkin" for its cucumber-like shape, is a solid of revolution designed using parametric modelling. Its geometry was chosen not purely for aesthetic reasons, but to minimise whirling air currents at its base. Despite the building's apparently curved surface, all the panels of glass forming its skin are flat, except for the lens at the top. Most of the panels are quadrilaterals, as they can be cut from rectangular glass with less wastage than triangular panels.

The traditional yakhchal (ice pit) of Persia functioned as an evaporative cooler. Above ground, the structure had a domed shape, but had a subterranean storage space for ice and sometimes food as well. The subterranean space and the thick heat-resistant construction insulated the storage space year round. The internal space was often further cooled with windcatchers.

== See also ==
- Black Rock City
- Mathematics and art
- Patterns in nature
