= Spinadel =

Spinadel is a surname. Notable people with the surname include:

- Erico Spinadel (1929–2020), Argentine-Austrian industrial engineer
- Laura P. Spinadel (born 1958), Argentine architect and writer
- Vera W. de Spinadel (1929–2017), Argentine mathematician
