= Lionel March =

British mathematician, architect, and digital artist (1934–2018)

- Born: January 26, 1934; Hove, England, UK
- Died: 20 February 2018 (aged 84)
- Citizenship: British
- Education: Magdalene College, Cambridge
- Scientific career
- Fields: Mathematics; Architecture; Digital art
- Workplaces: University of Cambridge; University of Waterloo; Open University; University of California, Los Angeles

Lionel John March (26 January 1934 – 20 February 2018) was a British mathematician, architect and digital artist, perhaps best known for his early pioneering of computer-aided architecture and art.

== Early life and education ==
March was born in Hove, England on 26 January 1934. As a teenager, his interests included mathematics, theatre and design. At the age of 17 he wrote an original mathematical paper generalizing the theory of complex numbers to n-dimensions, for which the computer pioneer Alan Turing wrote "you have done this research with imagination and competence".

For this, March was awarded a state scholarship to read mathematics at Magdalene College, Cambridge in 1954, with a personal recommendation from Alan Turing, where he earned a B.A. and Doctor of Science. During his studies, March was the President of the Cambridge University Opera Group, for which he designed stage sets. Early work also included illustrations, and book cover designs for Cambridge University Press.

== Later life and career ==
March was the first director of the Centre for Land Use and Built Form Studies, now the Martin Centre for Architectural and Urban Studies, Cambridge University. He held professorships in systems engineering at the University of Waterloo, Ontario; in design technology at the Open University, Milton Keynes; and from 1984 in the Graduate School of Architecture and Urban Planning, UCLA, where he was the chair in the period 1985–1991 and was professor emeritus in design and computation until his death.

March also experimented in serial art since the 1960s and became one of the world's first digital artists. In 1962 he held an exhibition titled "Experiments in serial art" in the Institute of Contemporary Arts in London, and since then he completed 50 years of art production working with the golden ratio, the Platonic solids, and geometric and mathematical principles in design.

March's biggest contribution is in architecture and computation. In 1965 he worked as an assistant of Leslie Martin for the project Whitehall: a Plan for a National and Government Centre, and as such he made one of the first computer-aided architectural investigations. After that, he devoted himself in research, writing and editing numerous books. He was the founding editor of the international research journal Planning and Design, now known as Urban Analytics and City Science, which is one of the four Environment and Planning journals. He was general editor of the 12-volume Cambridge Architectural and Urban Studies.

In some publications, he wrote in defence of Leon Battista Alberti's authorship of the Hypnerotomachia Poliphili.

March's archives are located at the Canadian Centre for Architecture.

== Personal life and death ==
March had been married twice. In 1960, he married Shirley Imogen Lindsay Miller, a graduate of New Hall, Cambridge, and daughter of Arthur Austin Miller (1900–1968), a notable academic of geography. In 1984, he married Maureen Vidler (d. 2013).

March died on 20 February 2018 at the age of 84. Subsequently, a signed letter from Alan Turing to March was sold at Bonhams auction house in London on 27 March 2019 for £27,562.50.

== Awards and honours ==
March was the recipient of the Harkness Fellowship of the Commonwealth Fund (1962).

== Bibliography ==
- March, Lionel (1976). The Architecture of Form. Cambridge, UK: Cambridge University Press.
- March, Lionel (1998). Architectonics of Humanism: Essays on Number in Architecture. Chichester, UK: Academy Editions.
- March, Lionel; Steadman, Philip (1974). The Geometry of Environment: An Introduction to Spatial Organization in Design. Cambridge, MA: MIT Press.
- March, Lionel; Martin, Leslie (1972). Urban Space and Structures. Cambridge, UK: Cambridge University Press.
- March, Lionel (1993). Sheine, Judith (ed.). R.M. Schindler: Composition and Construction. London, UK: Academy Editions.
- Williams, Kim; March, Lionel; Wassell, Stephen R. (2010). The Mathematical Works of Leon Battista Alberti. Basel, Switzerland: Birkhäuser.
