= History of architectural engineering =

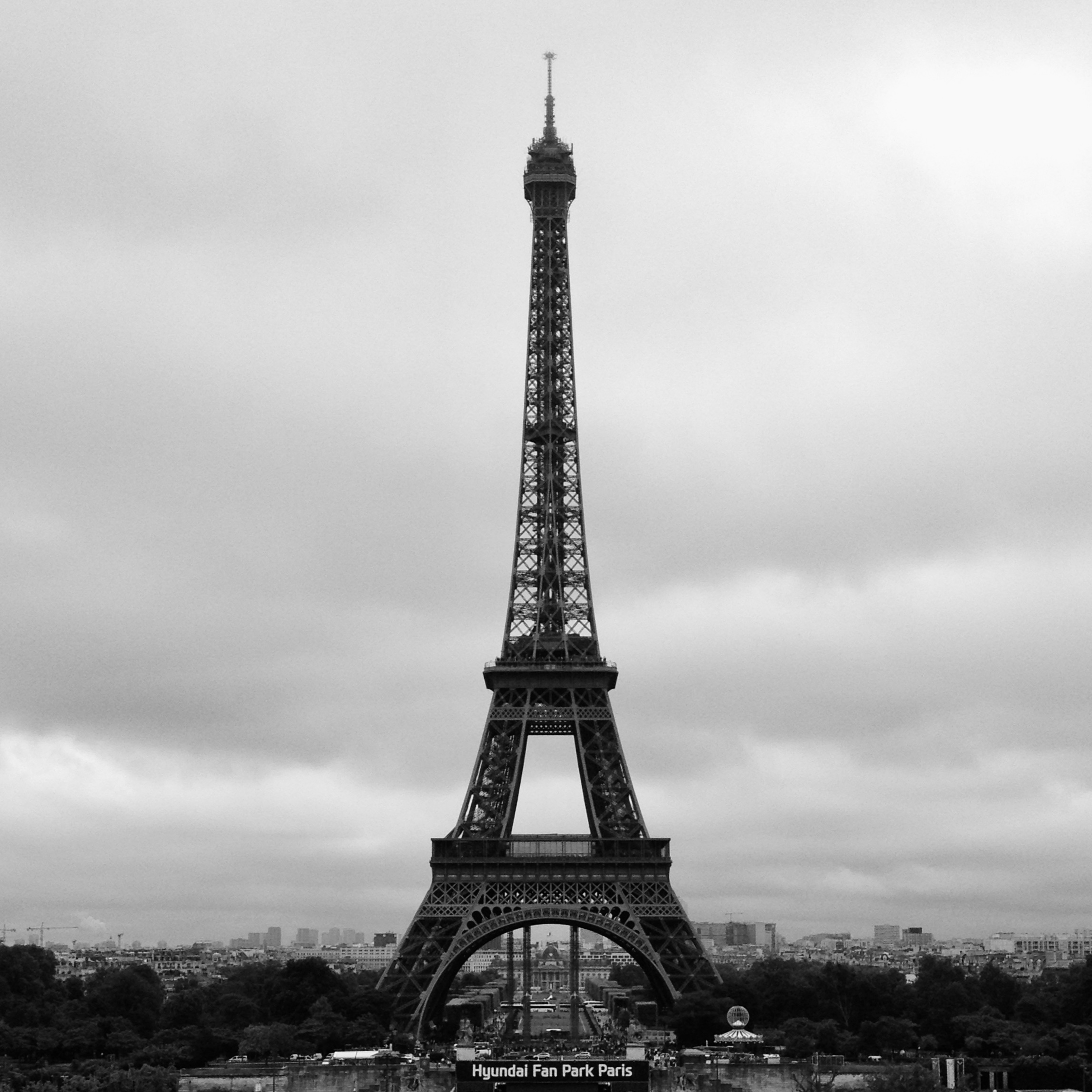
Eiffel Tower (photographer Anthony Ludwar)

Architecture has been closely associated with engineering in the history of the building construction. The engineering for buildings was determined empirically in the early periods; later, scientific calculations for structures were developed in the 17th century, and engineering was taught as a separate course in the 18th century. Architectural engineering was established as a discipline in the formal realm of engineering in the late 19th century when the University of Illinois became the first of many universities to offer an architectural engineering program. The university with the longest ABET (Accreditation Board for Engineering and Technology, Inc.) accreditation is Pennsylvania State University, which received theirs in 1935.

== Early periods ==
In the early periods, there was no clear separation between architecture and engineering. The Roman author Vitruvius wrote in The Ten Books on Architecture the aesthetic principles of architecture as well as aspects of Roman engineering and construction materials such as concrete. Medieval master builders who were involved in the construction of cathedrals relied on their knowledge deduced empirically and codified into rules rather than on the science of statics. In the 17th century, Galileo was the first to introduce some elements of modern science into the structural calculation of building by determining the breaking strength of beams, and this was followed by the work of Robert Hooke.

The two disciplines of architecture and engineering began to separate in the mid-18th century when engineering schools were established.

== Modern era ==
Many modern architects such as Frank Lloyd Wright were trained as engineers rather than architects, while engineers such as Gustave Eiffel produced well-known structures. Architecture and engineering came together as a field of study in the United States when architectural Engineering was established as a university program in the late 19th century. It has now developed into a field that is closely associated with all aspects of the built environment, from the planning and design to the construction and operation of structures. Notable modern figures in engineering involved in architecture include Santiago Calatrava and Ove Arup. Recent advances in computing have allowed for complex structural calculations and produce more adventurous architectural designs.

On October 1, 1998 NSAE (National Society of Architectural Engineers) and AED (Architectural Engineering Division) joined together to form AEI (Architectural Engineering Institute), which is a branch of ASCE (American Society of Civil Engineers).

== Architectural engineering in the curriculum ==
The first known architectural engineering program at a university was established in 1891 at the University of Illinois. This program was created within the College of Engineering in conjunction with a school of architecture. MIT started an architectural engineering program in 1897 for the training of engineers on architecture, and by 1912, there were 11 architectural engineering programs. These would become ABET(Accreditation Board for Engineering and Technology, Inc.) accredited architectural engineering programs. Since then, other schools have also been ABET accredited for their architectural engineering program, such as the University of Wyoming.

Modern architectural engineering courses are given primarily in engineering schools. Around 60 institutions now offer courses and degrees on the subject around the world, some of which are listed below.

=== Institutions ===
Institution (In Order Accredited)	Degrees	ABET Accredited Date
The Pennsylvania State University	B.A.E., M.A.E, M.Eng, M.S., PhD.	10/01/1936-Present
Kansas State University	B.S., M.S.	10/01/1936-09/30/1961,10/01/1980-Present
The University of Kansas (formerly University of Kansas)	B.S., M.S.	10/01/1936-Present
University of Colorado Boulder (formerly University of Colorado at Boulder)	B.S., M.S., PhD.	10/01/1936-Present
University of Texas at Austin	B.S., M.S.	10/01/1938-Present
University of Oklahoma	B.S.	10/01/1960-Present
University of Miami	B.S., M.S.	10/01/1962-Present
North Carolina Agricultural and Technical State University	B.S.	10/01/1969-Present
California Polytechnic State University	B.S., M.S.	10/01/1975-Present
Tennessee State University	B.S.	10/01/1977-Present
Oklahoma State University	B.S.	10/01/1986-Present
University of Wyoming	B.S., M.S.	10/01/1986-Present
Milwaukee School of Engineering	B.S., M.S.	10/01/1988-Present
Drexel University	B.S.	10/01/1989-Present
Illinois Institute of Technology	B.S., M.S.	10/01/2001-Present
University of Nebraska–Lincoln	B.S., M.S., PhD.	10/01/2002-Present
Missouri University of Science and Technology (formerly University of Missouri-Rolla)	B.S.	10/01/2004-Present
Texas A&M University Kingsville (formerly Texas A&I University)	B.S.	10/01/2009-Present
University of Detroit Mercy	B.S.	07/01/2013-Present
Worcester Polytechnic Institute	B.S.	10/01/2013-Present
Lawrence Technological University	B.S, M.S.	10/01/2014-Present
University of Alabama	B.S.	10/01/2015-Present
University of Cincinnati	B.S.	10/01/2015-Present
University of Arkansas at Little Rock	B.S.	10/01/2016-Present

== See also ==
- HVAC
- History of structural engineering
- History of architecture
