= DIN 276 =

- DIN: 276
- Area: construction industry
- Title: Construction Costs, Part 1: Building Construction, Part 4: Civil Engineering
- Summary: Identification and structure of construction costs
- Last output: 2008-12 / 2009-08

DIN 276 is a DIN standard used in architectural engineering for two main services:

- To determine the project costs
- To determine the fee for architects and engineers

== Scope ==
Only part 1 building construction (last updated 2008–12) and part 4 engineering are valid.

"This part of the standard applies to cost planning in building construction, in particular for the determination and organization of costs. It covers the costs of new construction, reconstruction and modernization of buildings and related project-related costs; for building construction costs, DIN 18960 applies."

With the new edition of DIN 276-1 of December 2008, amendment A1 of February 2008 and amendment 1 of February 2007 were incorporated into the standard.

The version of April 1981 of DIN 276 is used in the HOAI 1996/2002 for fee determination. The old version is used, because the federal legislature did not follow the further development of DIN 276 in the price law for architects and engineers and did not adapt the cost groups in the regulation text of the HOAI 1996. The cost calculations are thus to be set up in two structures: in the most recent for project processing and in the version of 1981 only for fee determination.

== General changes to the new edition 2006 ==
In 2006, changes were made to the title and structure to open the standard beyond building construction to other areas of construction. Compared with DIN 276: 1993–06, the following changes were made:

Substantive changes

- The principles of costing have been extended to principles of cost planning
- For the term "cost", principles of application have been formulated
- The principles of costing have been redefined with the goal of greater cost-effectiveness
- The costing stages have been extended and redrafted with a view to continuous cost planning
- For cost control principles of application have been formulated

Editorial changes

- The scope of the standard has been redrafted in line with the changed content
- The terms have been changed and supplemented according to the state of the art
- The structure of the cost breakdown remains unchanged; the description has been changed editorially
- The execution-oriented breakdown of costs has been retained as an alternative; Table 2 has been deleted
- The presentation of the cost breakdown has been editorially revised according to the state of the art
- Annex A has been deleted.
