= Centre of Mathematics and Design =

Research institute at the University of Buenos Aires

Centre of Mathematics and Design (MAyDI) (Spanish: Centro de Matemática y Diseño) was created at the Faculty of Architecture, Design and Urbanism of the University of Buenos Aires, in 1995, under the direction of Vera W. de Spinadel.

This Centre received several research and development grants from the Secretary of Science and Technology of the University of Buenos Aires. At the Scientific Renewable Programming 2004–2007, they received a stipendium for the creation of a Mathematics & Design Laboratory MyD_Lab. This Laboratory was officially inaugurated on April 15, 2005 and its main aim is to act as a technological pole of support, assessor ship and training in the subjects referred to the application of mathematical and informatical methodologies so as to state, develop and solve in an optimal way applied problems. The research lines in development are the following

- Optimization of the Buenos Aires University Campus Habitat
- Modeling in Inference Statistics
- Planning, administration and control of projects
- Study of urban morphologies using fractal geometry and complexity theory
- Analysis of the interdisciplinarity of mathematics in relation to Design, Art and Science
- Transference at the graduate and post-graduate level of multimedia material in the form of books, videos, web, seminar, “on line” courses, etc.
