= Computer-aided architectural engineering =

Computer-aided architectural engineering (CAAE) is the use of information technology for architectural engineering, in tasks such as the analysis, simulation, design, manufacture, planning, diagnosis and repair of architectural structures. CAAE is a subclass of computer-aided engineering. The first Computer-aided architectural design was written by the 1960s. It helped architectures very much that they do not need to draw blueprints. Computer-aided design also known as CAD was the first type of program to help architectures but since it did not have all the features, Computer-aided architectural engineering created as a specific software with all the tools for design.

== Overview ==
All CAAD and CAAE systems use a set of data with geometric and other aspects of an abject; they all use information technology to assembling design from standard or non-standard pieces. For example, software like computer animation is what is made in CAAE field. All the blue prints around us is made by CAAE or CAAD software.

== Degree ==
Getting a degree in computer-aided architectural engineering can qualify one for higher-level positions. This specialization is for students interested in having careers in architectural engineering and drafting.a CAAE can have jobs in many areas such as Expeditor, Construction Estimator, Project Manager, project architecture and many other fields related to these.

== Advantages ==
An advantages to CAAE is to develop the two-way mapping software of subject. The two dimension mapping are set to be between the surface structure (TM1) and the deep structure (TM2). In designing the systems, system designers usually pay attention to TM1. The important statement here is a one-to-one mapping, which is to create a computer functionality that maps as close as possible into a resulted manual design project. An engineer's works mostly involves visually observe data and represent them. Problems are usually outlined and dealt with in graphical result. Therefore, the designer should have a lot control over the processes happens within the design.

== See also ==
- Architectural design optimization
- Comparison of CAD software
- Design computing
