= Vera W. de Spinadel =

Argentine mathematician

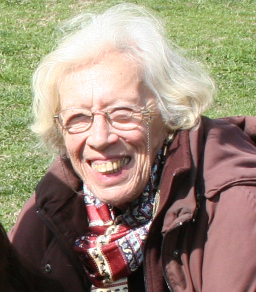
- Born: 22 August 1929; Buenos Aires, Argentina
- Died: 26 January 2017 (aged 87); Buenos Aires, Argentina
- Education: University of Buenos Aires
- Spouse: Erico Spinadel
- Children: Laura P. Spinadel, Pablo Spinadel, Irene Spinadel, Andrea Gisela Spinadel

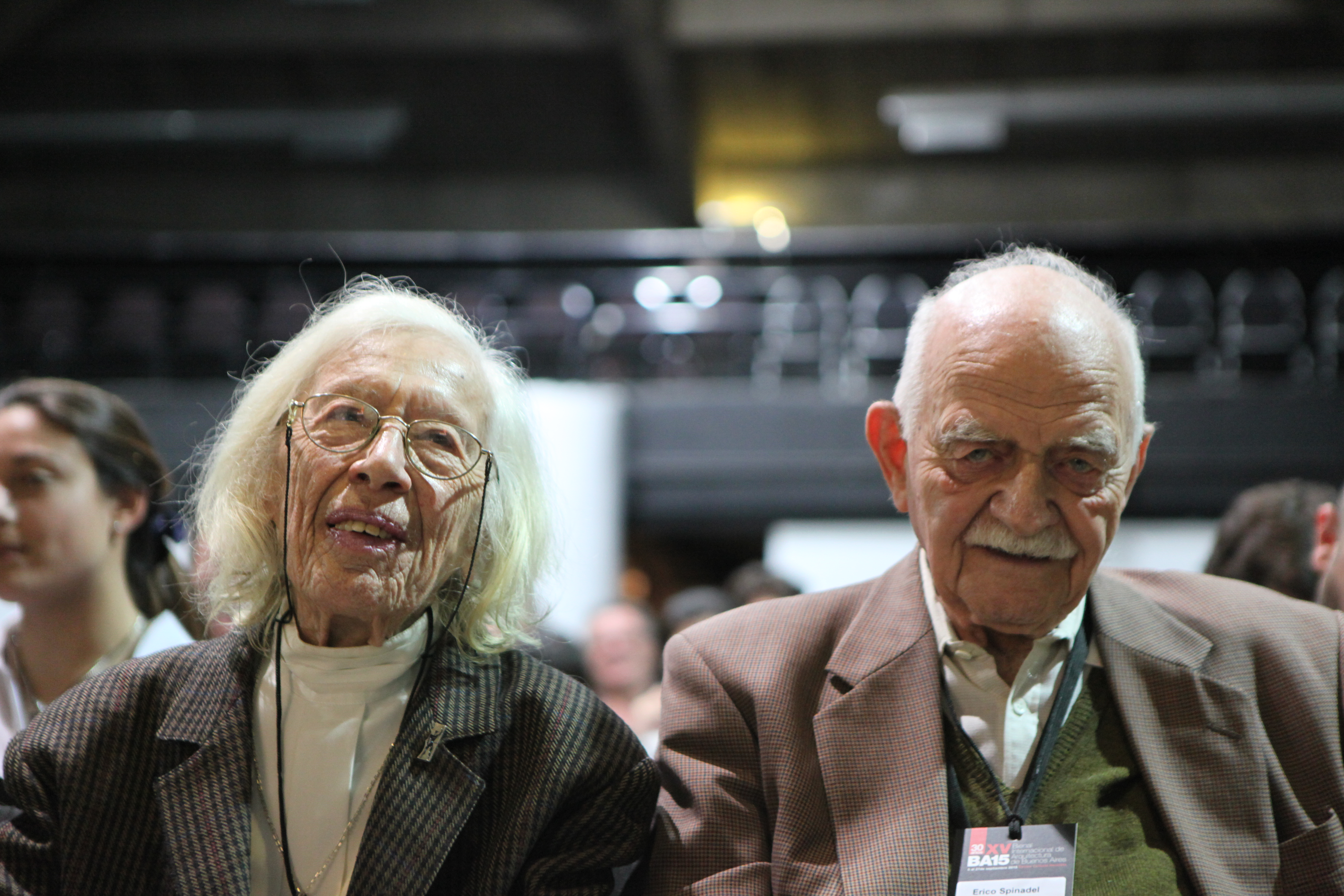
Vera W de Spinadel & Erico Spinadel

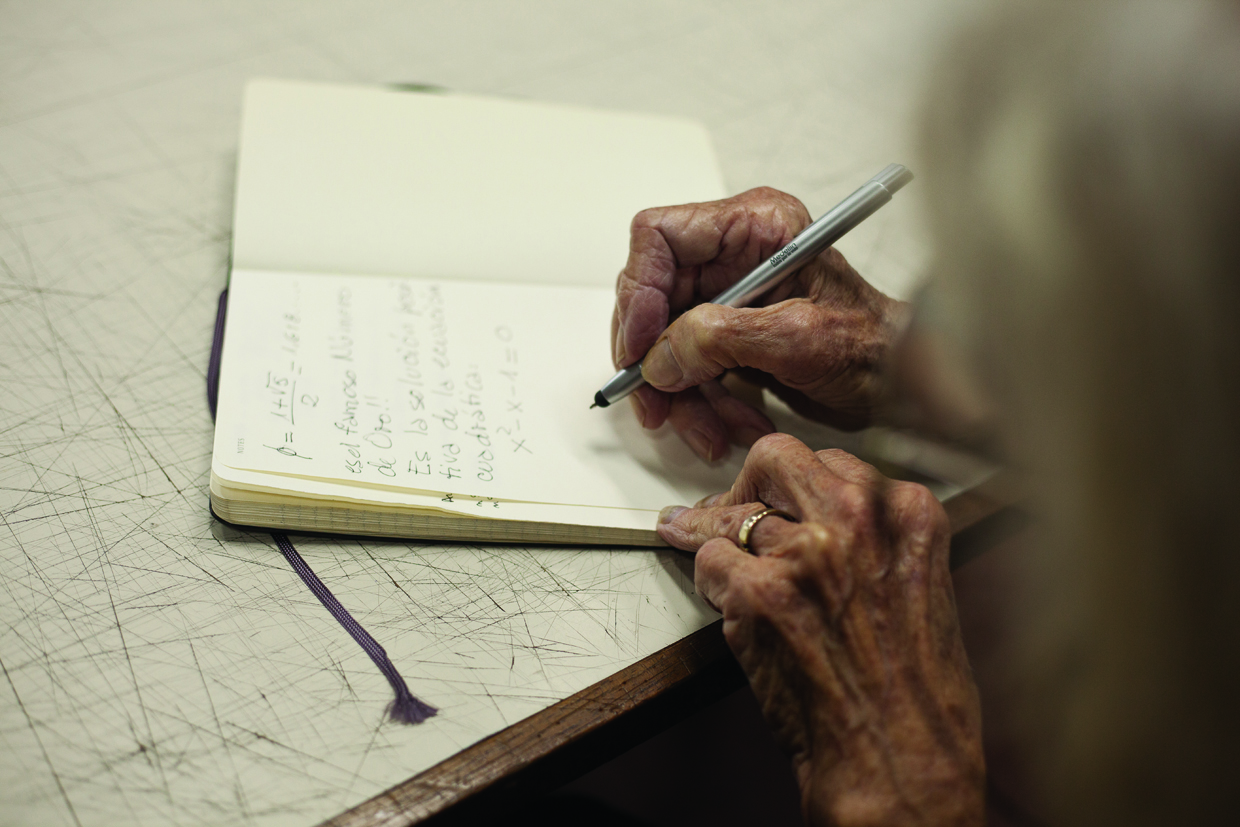
Vera Martha Winitzky de Spinadel, writing

Vera Martha Winitzky de Spinadel (August 22, 1929 – January 26, 2017) was an Argentine mathematician. She was the first woman to gain a PhD in mathematics at the University of Buenos Aires, Argentina, in 1958. Between 2010 and 2017, she was full Emeritus Professor in the Faculty of Architecture, Design and Urban Planning of the University of Buenos Aires. In 1995, she was named Director of the Centre of Mathematics and Design. In April 2005 she inaugurated the Laboratory of Mathematics & Design, University Campus in Buenos Aires. From 1998 to her death she was the President of the International Mathematics and Design Association, which organizes international congresses every three years and publishes a Journal of Mathematics & Design. She was the author of more than ten books and published more than 100 research papers. Spinadel was a leader in the field of metallic mean and in the development of the classical Golden Ratio and got wide international recognition.

== Books ==
- From the Golden Mean to Chaos, Editorial Nueva Librería, Buenos Aires, Argentina, 260 pp. OCLC 246088542, 1998
- The Metallic Means and Design, Nexus II: Architecture and Mathematics. Editor: Kim Williams. Edizioni dell’Erba, ISBN 88-86888-13-9, 1998
- Del Número de Oro al Caos. Editorial Nobuko S. A., ISBN 987-43-5890-4, 2003
- Geometría Fractal, in collaboration with Jorge G. Perera and Jorge H. Perera, with CD with Images. Editorial Nobuko S. A., ISBN 987-1135-20-3, 2003
- From the Golden Mean to Chaos, Editorial Nobuko S. A. ISBN 987-1135-48-3, 2004
- Geometría Fractal, with Jorge G. Perera & Jorge H. Perera, Editorial Nueva Librería, 2nd edition, ISBN 978-987-1104-45-1, 2007
- Cálculo Superior, 1st. Editorial Nueva Librería, ISBN 978-987-1104-72-7, 2009.
- From the Golden Mean to Chaos, 3rd Edition, Editorial Nueva Librería, ISBN 978-987-1104-83-3, Junio 2010.
- Forma y matemática: La familia de Números Metálicos en Diseño, 1st. Edition. Buenos Aires: Nobuko. Ediciones FADU, Serie Difusión 22. ISBN 978-987-584-319-6, 2011
- Forma y matemática II: Fractales y forma, 1st. Edition. Buenos Aires: Nobuko. Ediciones FADU, Serie Difusión 24. ISBN 978-987-584-448-3, 2012

== Selected papers ==
- "Del Número de Oro al caos", 2nd. Edition. Editorial Nueva Librería, Buenos Aires. ISBN 978-987-1871-17-9, 2013.
- "Visualización y tecnología aplicados al Diseño", 8o. Encuentro de Docentes de Matemática en carreras de Arquitectura y Diseño de Universidades Nacionales del Mercosur, August 14–16, 2013, Facultad de Arquitectura, Urbanismo y Diseño, Universidad Nacional de San Juan, San Juan Argentina. Digital publication. ISBN 978-950-605-756-5.
- "From George Odom to a new system of Metallic Means", in collaboration with Gunter Weiss, VII Conferencia Internacional de Matemática y Diseño M&D-2013 (02-06 Septiembre 2013), Facultad de Arquitectura y Urbanismo, Universidad Nacional de Tucumán, San Miguel de Tucumán, Argentina. Proceedings publish in vol. 13 Journal of Mathematics & Design, pp. 71–86, ISBN 978-987-27417-2-3, 2014.
- "Cordovan spirals", in collaboration with Antonia Redondo Buitrago, VII Conferencia Internacional de Matemática y Diseño M&D-2013 (02-06 Septiembre 2013), Facultad de Arquitectura y Urbanismo, Universidad Nacional de Tucumán, San Miguel de Tucumán, Argentina. Proceedings publish vol. 13 Journal of Mathematics & Design, pp. 124–145, ISBN 978-987-27417-2-3, 2014.
- "Bi-Arc spirals in Minkowski planes", in collaboration with Gunter Weiss. Proceedings of the 16th International Conference on Geometry and Graphics ICGG 2014, Innsbruck (04-8 August 2014), Eds. Hans-Peter Schröder and Manfred Hosty, Innsbruck University Press, pp- 115-120, 2014.
- "Generalized Metallic Means Family". Proceedings of the 16th International Conference on Geometry and Graphics ICGG 2014, Innsbruck (04-8 August 2014), Eds. Hans-Peter Schröder and Manfred Hosty, Innsbruck University Press, pp- 459-465, 2014.

== Awards ==
- Gold medal 30º university teaching UBA
- 2010: Emeritus Professor UBA
