= Architectural design optimization =

Architectural design optimization (ADO) is a subfield of engineering that uses optimization methods to study, aid, and solve architectural design problems, such as optimal floorplan layout design, optimal circulation paths between rooms, sustainability and the like. ADO can be achieved through retrofitting, or it can be incorporated within the initial construction a building. Methods of ADO might include the use of metaheuristic, direct search or model-based optimisation. It could also be a more rudimentary process involving identification of a perceived or existing problem with a buildings design in the concept design phase.

== Evolution of digital ADO ==
The origins of digital based methods of ADO can be attributed to the early days of Computer-Aided Design (CAD), a type of software which enabled architects to create, modify and optimise their drafts freely within a digital environment. Although CAD was invented in the early 1960s, with Ivan Sutherland's Sketchpad, its applications predominated the aerospace and automotive industries. It was only until the 1970s that it became of novel use to architects, and only in the 90s did it become widespread within the industry. Programs such as AutoCAD, Rhinoceros and Revit have since assisted architects in the creation of more accurate, more extensively optimised designs by relying on computational power to determine efficient variables in areas of daylighting, energy consumption, circulation and the like. This process has been significantly aided by the integration of black box simulations such as genetic algorithms, which greatly increase the efficacy of ADO when used in conjunction with CAD software. Certain CAD software have begun to implement simulation algorithms natively within their programs. Grasshopper, a virtual programming environment within Rhinoceros 3D, utilises Galapagos as an inbuilt GA.

== Methods of ADO ==
=== Genetic algorithms ===
Illustration showing process of selection and deletion in evolutionary algorithms.

Genetic algorithms (GA) are the most popular form of metaheuristic, black box simulation utilised in the fulfilment of complex ADO. GA emulate the process of biological evolution by engaging in a recursive process of selection or deletion based on a criterion of 'fitness'. Fitness is determined by how effective or ineffective a solution is at solving a given design problem, such as the optimum angle of windows to achieve daylighting, circulation etc. What differentiates GA from more rudimentary, gradient method simulations is its ability to search for a solution from a population of potential solutions. This multi-directional approach accounts for the often-non-linear nature of architectural design problems by allowing for complex variables from multiple different areas to be incorporated into the optimisation process. The randomised, non-linear characteristics of GA mean they are capable offering solutions to design problems which are, at times, more inventive and unconventional than their search-based counterparts. Due to the complexity of GA simulations, they take a comparatively longer time to perform than other methods. This can be a significant implication to projects operating under time constraints. A study published in 2015 indicated that variations on traditional methods of GA could effectively reduce the processing time of simulations. These included methods of offline simulation and divide and conquer, which utilise architectural domain knowledge to simplify parameters in areas of daylighting and travel distance. This was proposed as one way to increase the accessibility of GA to architects.

=== Model-based optimisation ===
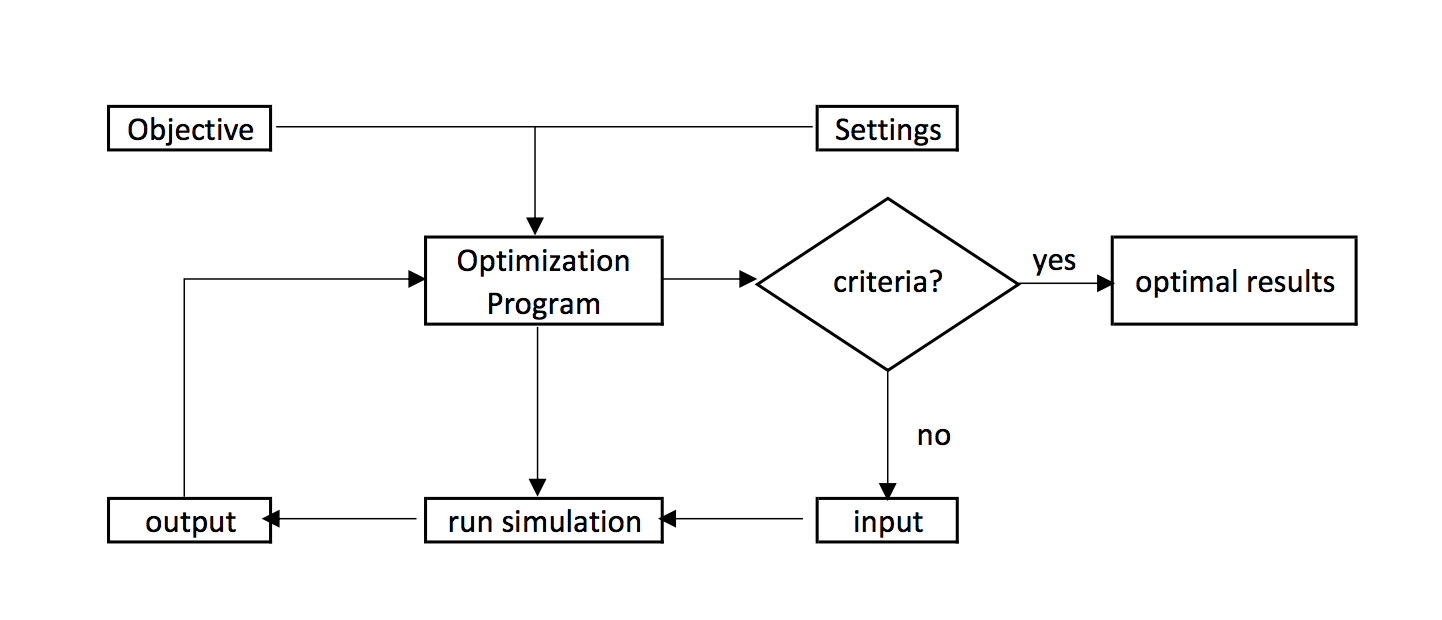
A flow chart for simulation-based optimisation.

Model-based optimisation, unlike metaheuristic and direct search methods, utilises a surrogate model to iteratively refine and optimise architecture. The surrogate model is an explicit representation of implicit mathematical processes, such as statistics or machine learning. Because this method constructs a surrogate model based on an approximation of the underlying simulations, it can be faster to process than alternative methods of black-box optimisation. The efficacy of the surrogate model is determined by the accuracy of the mathematical model. For this reason, some of the time-saving features of model-based optimisation could be invalidated by any additional time spent improving the mathematical functions which regulate the surrogate model. Model based optimisation is advantageous as it enables architects to visually articulate design problems and solutions in real time within design interfaces such as Grasshopper, Rhinoceros 3D, Dynamo BIM and GenerativeComponents.

=== Direct search ===
Direct search methods of optimisation operate by selecting parameters in a deterministic sequence, from one point to the next successively until a global optimum is achieved. It is not as ubiquitous a method as genetic algorithms in ADO, but research suggests it outperforms metaheuristic simulations such as GA when improvement attained through each evaluation is measured. There are two types of direct search optimisation, local direct search and global direct search. Single-objective local direct search is one of the earliest and most rudimentary optimisation techniques, but is still utilised in contemporary ADO. Multi-objective global direct search is generally considered to be more effective at solving complex architectural design problems.

=== Concept design ===
This method does not rely on computational optimisation, but instead requires the architect to locate areas of optimisation through creative problem solving. This method is limited in its reliance on individual performance and is not likely to yield the most effective optimisation on its own. It could be used in conjunction with optimisation simulations when simulation results are at odds with aesthetic requirements and compromise is necessary. It might also be required when architectural domain knowledge is unknown to the algorithm, and the designer must manually adjust parameters to simplify variables within the simulation.

=== Performance-based vs performance-driven optimisation ===
Performance-based and performance-driven optimisation are closely related to each other but vary in how they achieve ADO. The latter concerns itself primarily with the use of computational simulations to optimise based on a set of performance criteria, completing iterations independent from the designer. Performance-based optimisation relies more heavily on the input of the designer to complete iterations. For example, a designer will identify an aspect of a buildings performance that they wish to optimise in the concept design phase and interpret the results of localised simulations to complete iterations manually. This is generally less effective, but also less time-consuming, making it an attractive option for projects operating under time constraints. Certain aspects of a buildings performance which are not readily quantifiable, such as aesthetic and cultural performance, may require alternative methods of optimisation.

== Applications of ADO ==
=== Sustainability ===
One potential application of ADO is in the reduction of a building's energy consumption and environmental impact. This might be achieved through the optimisation of the envelope, or façade of a building to ensure ideal thermal properties, which could subsequently reduce the necessity of cooling and heating systems. Other aspects of a buildings form, such as roofing, might be optimised for renewable energy sources. ADO could also assist in the selection of materials that maintain aesthetic and structural qualities, while also being sustainable and of low environmental impact to the surrounding area. Research has shown that ADO can be used jointly with Building Information Modelling (BMI) to ensure the sustainable construction of architecture. This often involves a multi-disciplinary collaboration between architects, structural and mechanical engineers, and consultants. Model-based methods of ADO can be incorporated with BIM to estimate "energy consumption, cost analysis and lifecycle costs" and establish a buildings overall sustainability in relation to each of these criteria. Lifecycle analysis in particular can enable stakeholders to observe the impact of a buildings construction and make prescient decisions regarding its sustainability.

=== Daylighting ===
ADO can also be applied to ensure sufficient daylighting within a building. Black box simulations might assist in determining the optimum placement of windows, as well their size, in relation to the building's situation to maximise daylighting. They can similarly determine a floor plan that maximises daylighting from the building's exterior, while concurrently minimising the obstruction of light from interior rooms. Surrogate models, such as those used in model-based optimisation, have proved effective in optimising daylighting through the measurement of Useful Daylight Illuminance (UDI). UDI measures the daylight illuminance within a building based on what is most 'useful' to those inhabiting the space. A study measuring the success of optimal UDI in the New Jurong Church building compared optimisation of UDI using both GA and model-based simulations within Grasshopper. It found that RBFOpt, a model-based simulation, produced an objective value of 0.78 while Galapagos, a GA native to Grasshopper, produced a value of 0.05. Research has also indicated a combination of GA and parametric modelling as an effective method of optimising daylight illuminance. Visual comfort (glare) and thermal comfort are other potential applications of ADO to daylighting.

=== HVAC systems ===
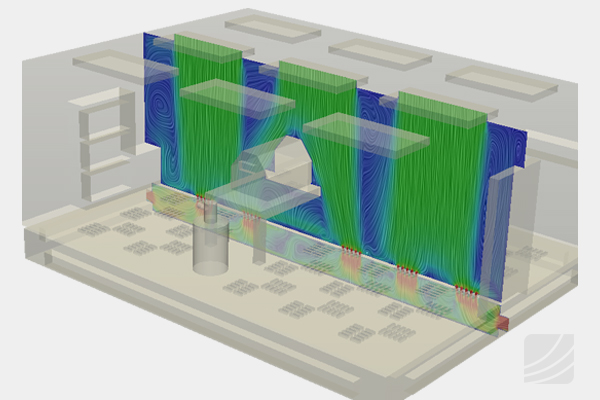
Simulation of a cleanrooms ventilation system using SimScale.

ADO can help to promote natural as well as man-made ventilation in a buildings design. This might involve establishing wind properties on a building's exterior to ascertain the most efficient method of natural ventilation. In areas where natural ventilation cannot be sufficiently optimised, such as in a buildings substructure, ADO can assist in developing an internal ventilation system that efficiently distributes air. The optimisation of HVAC systems can also allow for a reduction in CO_{2} emissions, which may increase a building's sustainability. Multi-objective simulations have proven capable of achieving this by optimising the insulation and 'tightness' of a building to reduce room temperatures and overheating. Evolutionary algorithms such as GA are particularly effective at optimising HVAC due to their multi-directional nature, accounting for interactions that occur between each system and other variables, such as the effects of climate.

=== Layout design ===
ADO could be employed to reduce travel time between internal areas of a building through the optimisation of its floor plan layout. Ideal circulation paths within a building might also be attained through the considered placement of stairwells, elevators, and escalators in relation to frequently used amenities. This type of optimisation concerns itself primarily with the spatial configuration of a building, encompassing things such as "component packaging, route path planning, process and facilities layout, VLSI design and architectural layout." Optimisation of these areas can be broken down further into the binaries of topology and geometry. Topology explores the relationship between structures in a buildings layout while geometry concerns itself more with the placement and dimensions of each structure. Research conducted in 2002 showed that the optimisation of geometry using gradient-based methods yielded successful results, while the optimisation of topology was limited due to the additional complexity of parameters. More recent studies have shown that model-based simulation using parametric modelling is effective at optimising the topology of structural elements outside of layout design, such as the design of truss structures.

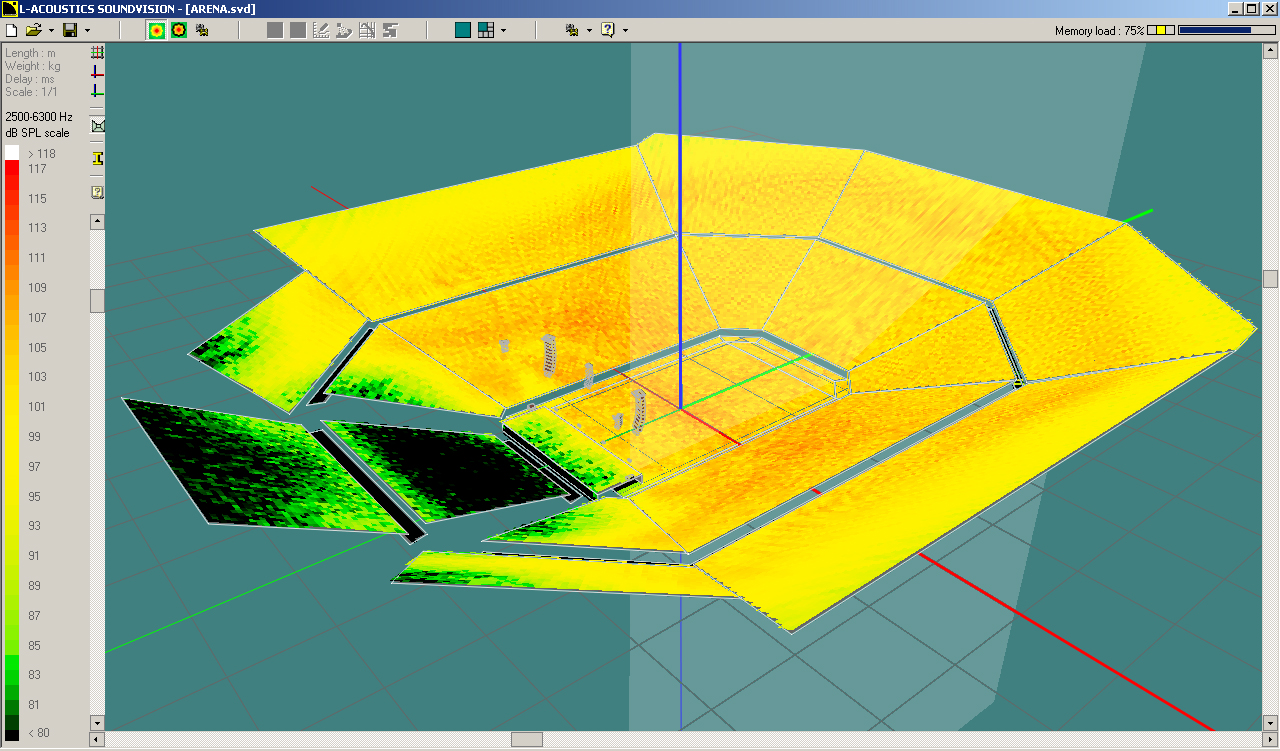
Acoustic simulation showing a visual distribution of sound based on decibels.

=== Acoustics ===
The acoustic qualities of a building can be optimised to provide appropriate volume as well as direct sound towards specified areas. The Strait Cultural Center in Fuzhou, China, utilised ADO to optimise the curvature of wall and ceiling structures to facilitate acoustic efficiency. This was achieved through the creation of an iterative model that optimised based on reflection coverage while concurrently reducing unwanted acoustic noise resulting from the shape of the geometry. Norman Foster and Arup similarly utilised ADO in their design of The Greater London Assembly Building, assessing acoustical performance through model-based simulations.

== Disadvantages of black box simulations ==
Due to the complex, time-consuming, computationally demanding and at times restrictive nature of black box simulations, there has been some debate over whether these methods are prohibitive in their practical, everyday use to architects. Architectural firms have been hesitant in the past to employ simulations due to a "lack of pressure/appreciation from the client, high cost of software acquisition and insufficient staff/training skills due to steep learning curves" as well as the absence of user-friendly interfaces. In a survey conducted in 2015, 93% of architects indicated that they would like to better understand the computational principles that underpin optimisation simulations. Other research aimed at addressing this very problem concluded that architects should be educated on the nature of black box simulations and should be able to readily engage with them through an intuitive program that obviates the need for any programming ability. A majority of architects in the survey also indicated a preference for global multi-objective simulations over local, single objective simulations. Multi-objective simulations, such as those that employ GA, solve this problem, but demand significant computational power and time. Research has been conducted to find a viable alternative to GA that exhausts less resources and will be more accessible to architects.
