= Laura P. Spinadel =

Austrian Argentine architect, urban planner, writer and educator

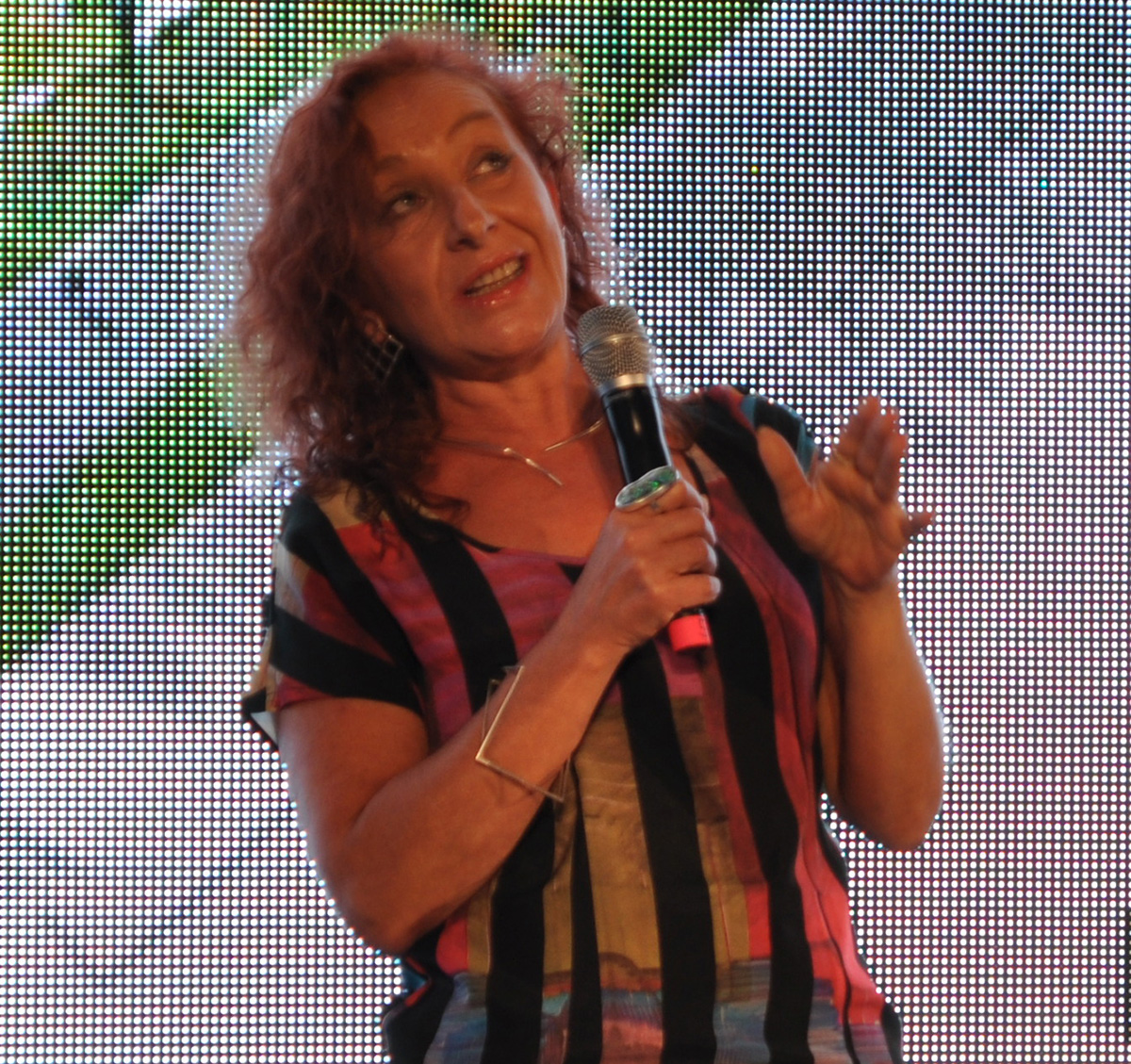
- Laura P. Spinadel © BOAnet.at
- Born: 7 July 1958; Buenos Aires, Argentina
- Occupation: Architect
- Awards: Architecture Award of the City of Vienna, 2015; Doctor Honoris Causa at the Civic Parliament of the Humanity, Transacademy Universal Institute of Nations, 2015; Golden Ring of Honour of Vienna University of Economics and Business, 2014
- Practice: BUSarchitektur & BOA büro für offensive aleatorik
- Website: www.busarchitektur.com www.boanet.at

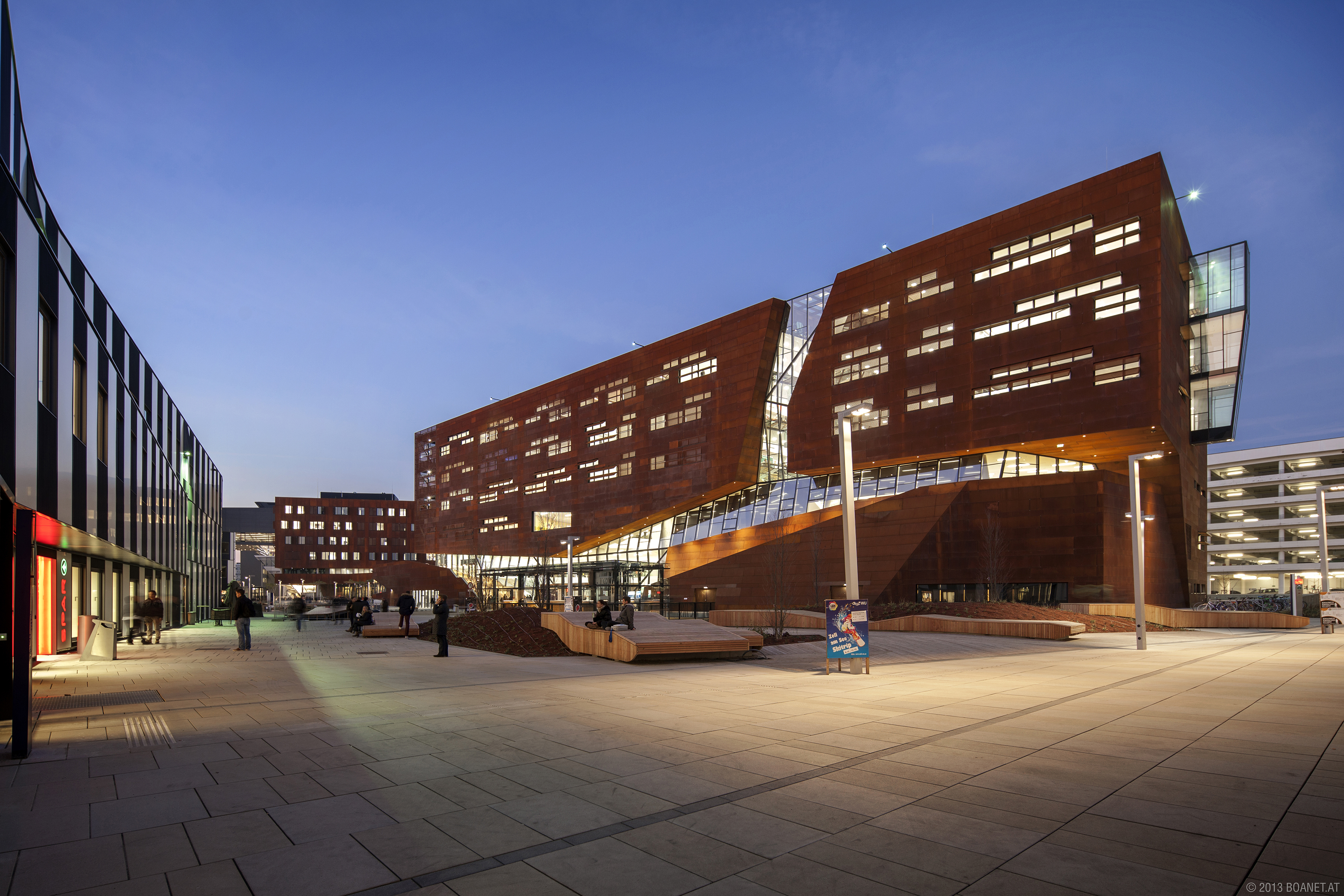
BOAnet D1TC BUSarchitektur Campus WU

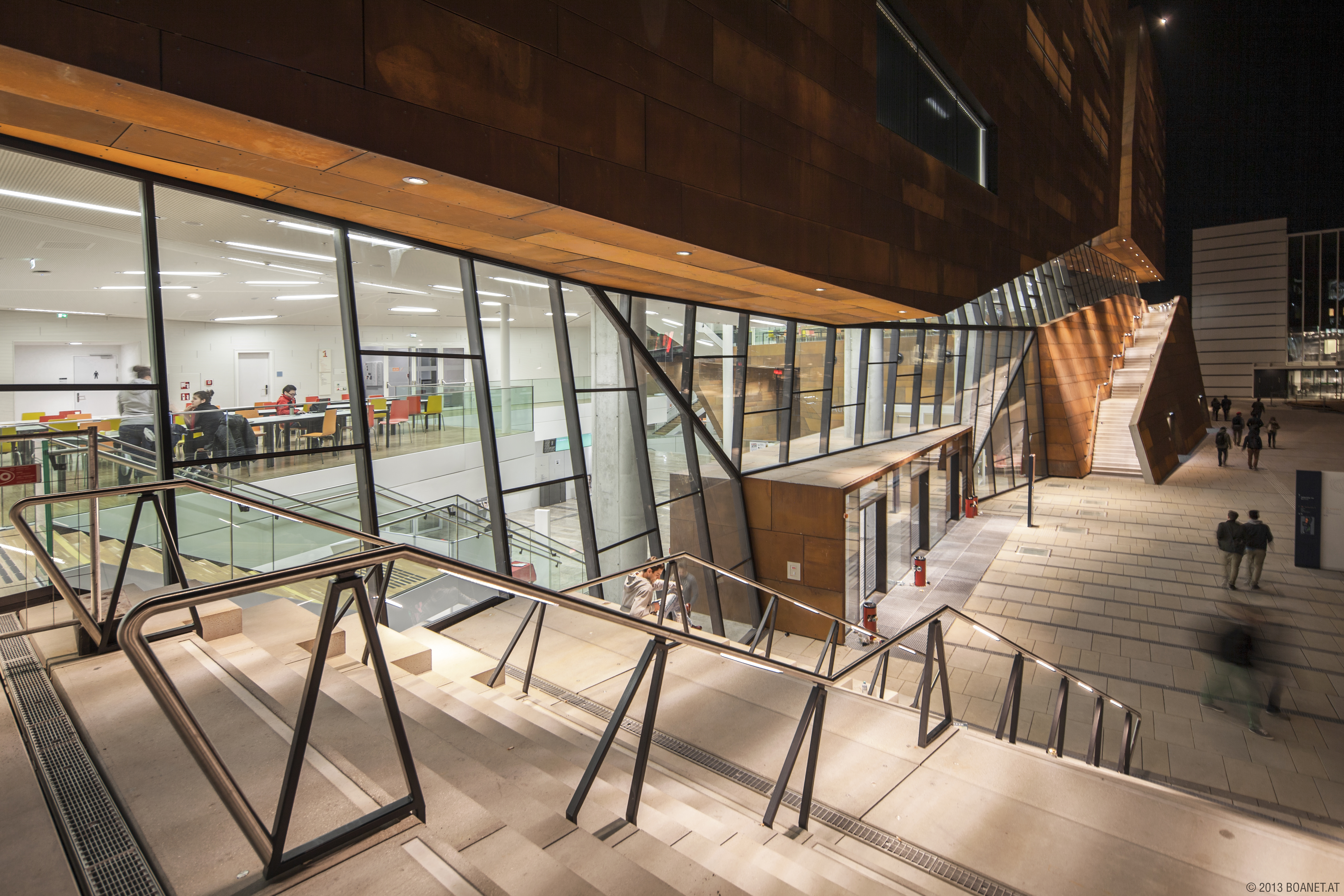
BOAnet Teaching Center Campus WU by BUSarchitektur

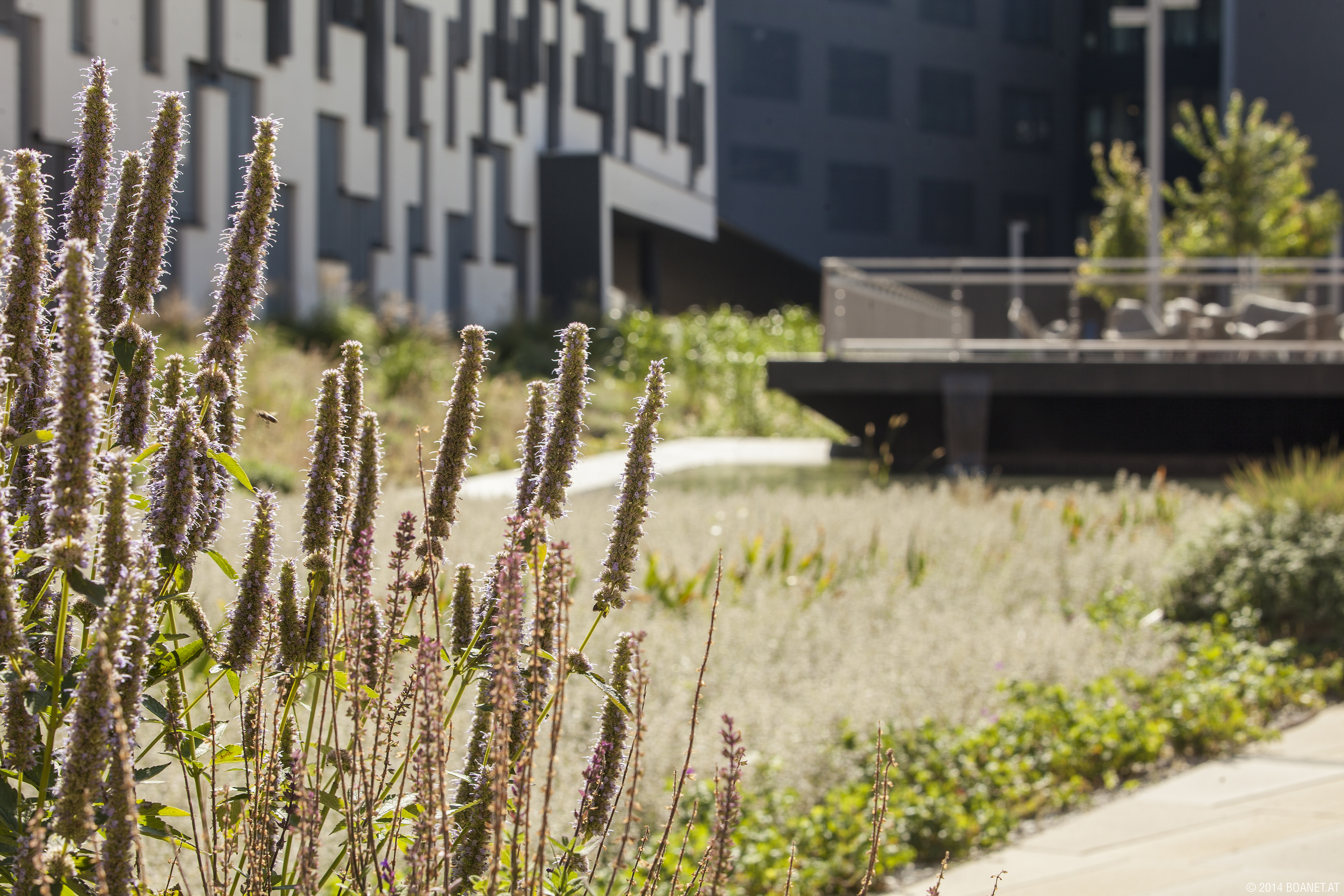
BOAnet Landscape BUSarchitektur Campus WU

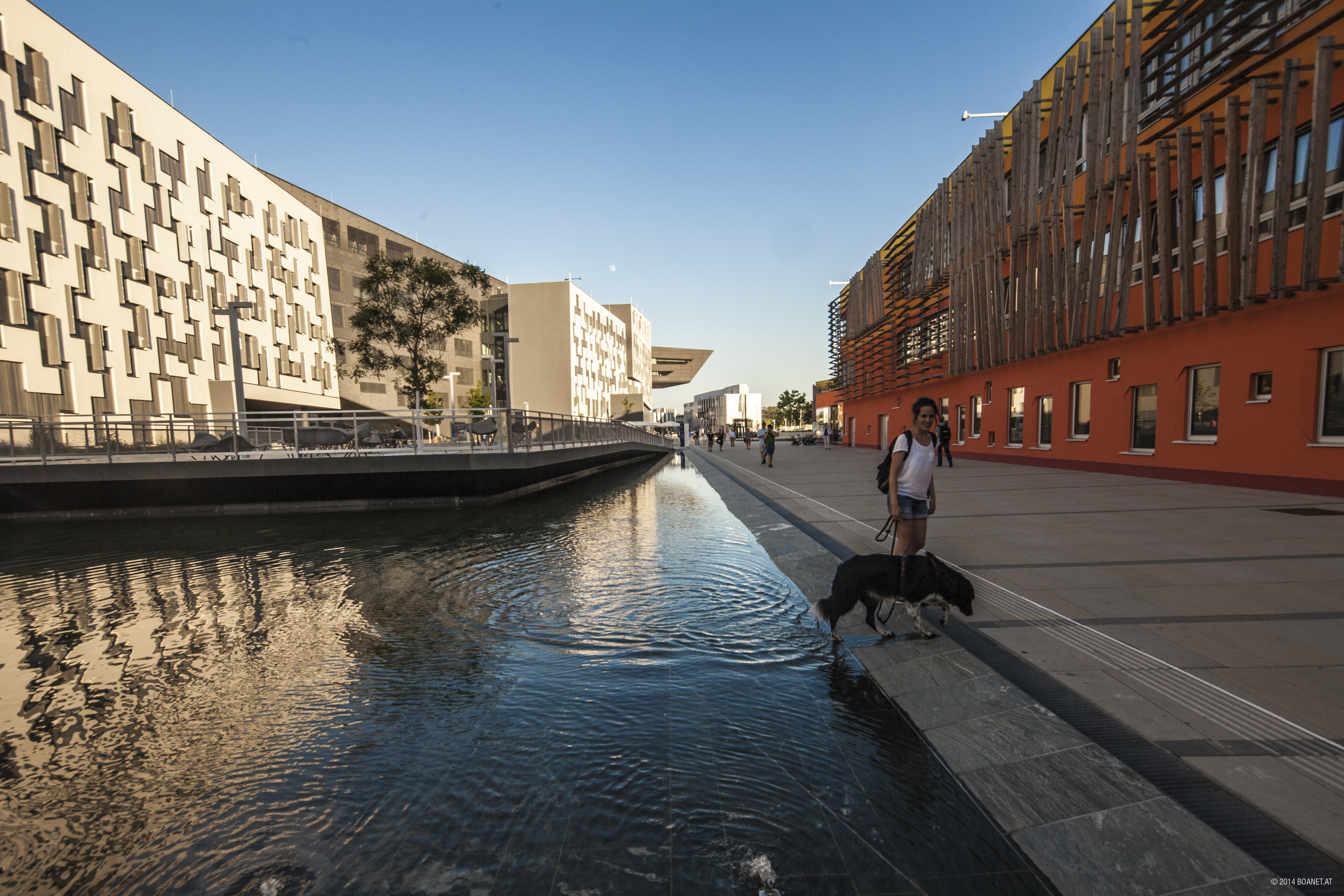
BOAnet Landscape Campus WU by BUSarchitektur

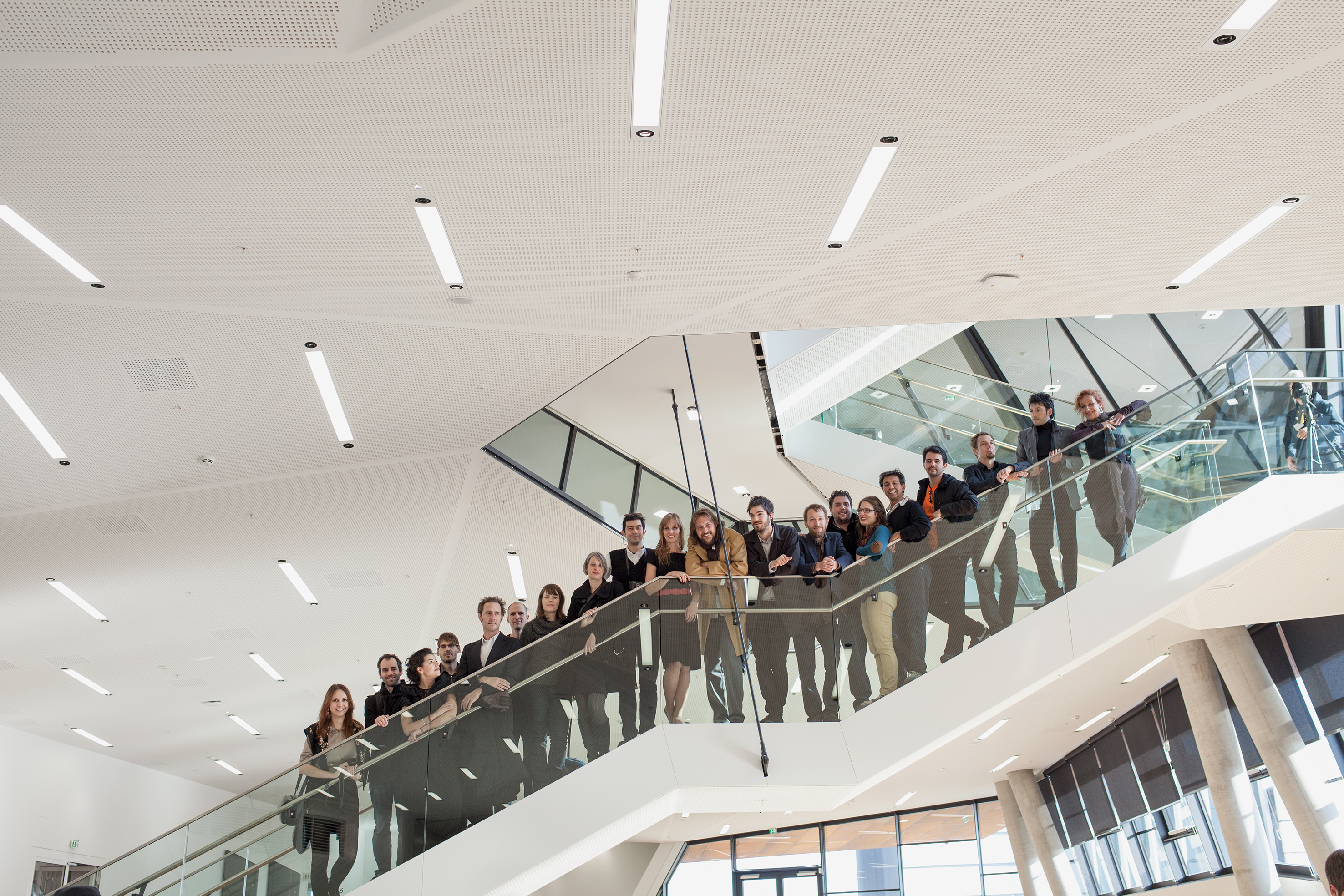
BUSarchitektur & BOA büro für offensive aleatorik

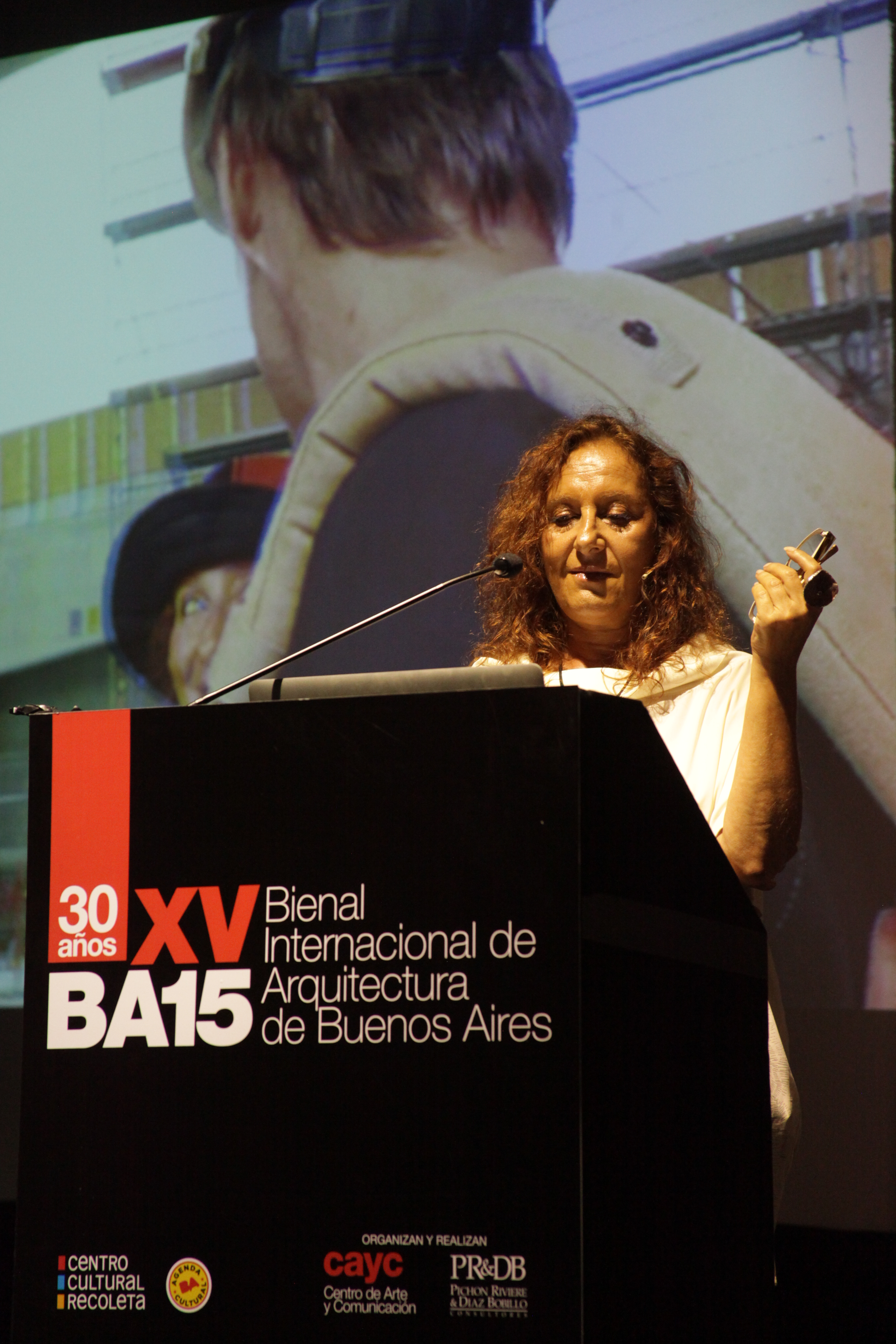
BOAnet Spinadel BA15 Negroni

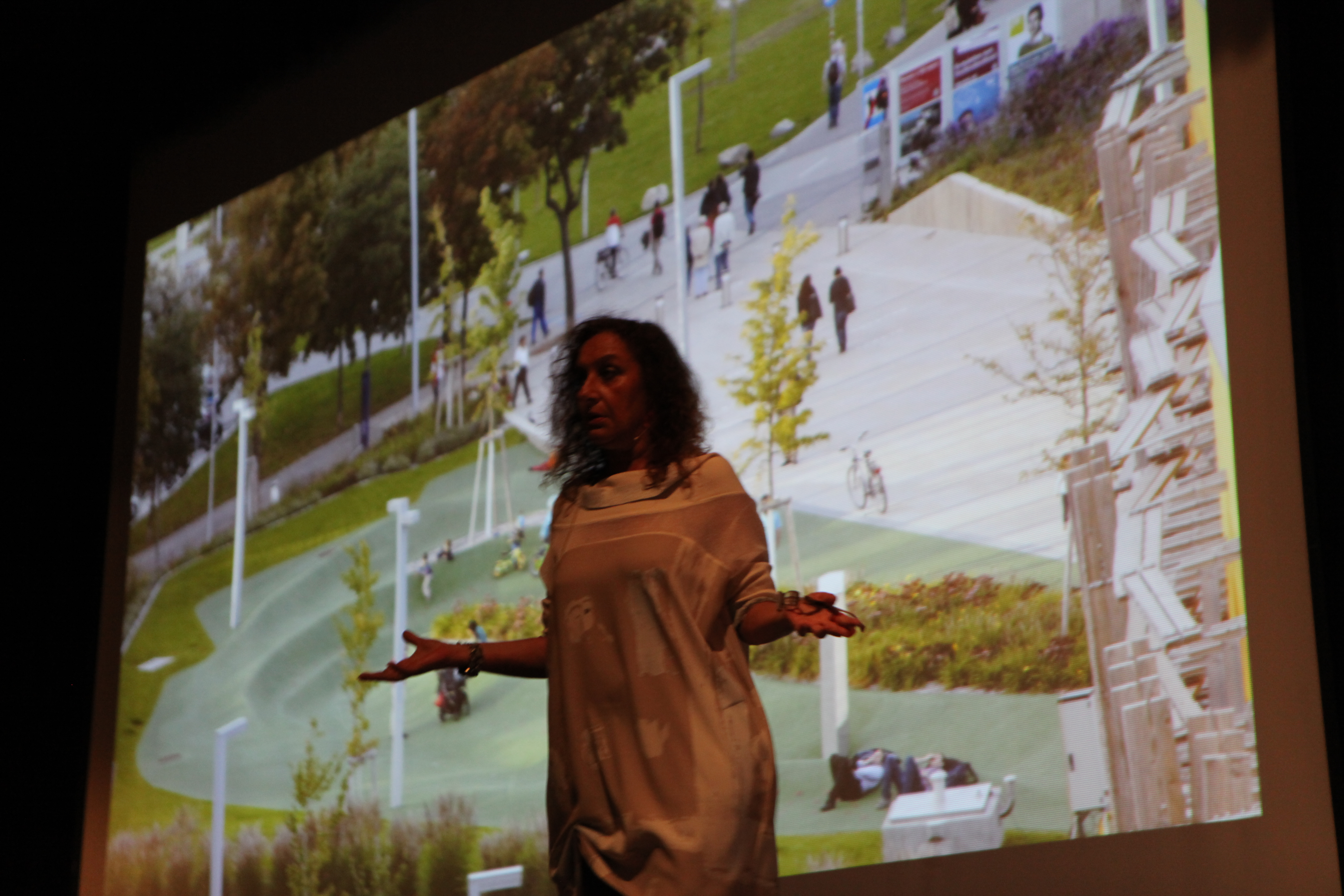
BOAnet Laura P. Spinadel, Pune

Laura Patricia Spinadel (7 July 1958 in Buenos Aires, Argentina) is an Austrian Argentine architect, urban planner, writer, educator and principal of the firm BUSarchitektur and of the company BOA büro für offensive aleatorik in Vienna. Laura P. Spinadel has made an international name based on her Compact City and Campus WU works, both considered pioneers of the holistic architecture ideology. She is Doctor Honoris Causa at the Civic Parliament of the Humanity, Transacademy Universal Institute of Nations.

== Education and teaching ==
Spinadel studied architecture at the FADU University of Buenos Aires where she was honoured with the Gold Medal Diploma. Her mother, Vera W. de Spinadel was an Argentine mathematician considered a leader in the field of "Metallic Means". Her father, Erico Spinadel, is an Austrian engineer considered a world eminence in wind energy issues.

In the mid-1980s, Spinadel taught at the University of Buenos Aires' Urban Strategies program and, simultaneously, served as Director of Community Interactions for Foreign Relations and Co-operative Projects. She served as a guest professor at the Universidad Pontificia Bolivariana in Medellín, Colombia; Università delli Studi di Palermo in Palermo, Italy; Escuela Superior Técnica de Arquitectura de Barcelona ETSAB in Barcelona, Spain; MKSSS's Dr. B. N. College of Architecture – Pune, India; Universidad Católica de Córdoba in Córdoba, Argentina; Colegio Oficial de Arquitectos de Tabasco in Villahermosa, México; Faculdade de Arquitetura da Universidade Federal do Rio Grande do Sul in Porto Alegre, Brazil.

== Architecture and planning ==
The work of Laura P. Spinadel is marked by the pursuit of comprehensiveness in ideas, processes, and results, undoubtedly influenced by the anthroposophical education. Since starting out with a humanistic, theosophical, and sensualist vision, Laura P. Spinadel has moved towards a holistic and ecological position that seeks to put maximum emphasis on the health of open and closed spaces, as well as on the requirements and principles of bio-construction. Holistic thinking implies profoundly replacing rational and analytical thought with a more inclusive thinking, in which all factors are taken into account, even those that seem trivial or invisible, such as perception, health or freedom. The Compact City in Vienna, Austria (1995–2001), was based on superimposed layers, compactness and high density structures. The project required that the architects get the agreement of many public and private company-stakeholders in order to create a completely self-contained autonomous block. The result is a layered city. The Master Plan for the Campus WU (Vienna University of Economics and Business) in Vienna, Austria (2007–2015) is by nature as complex as it is evolutionary. It embodies a multivalent negotiation of scales, conceptual principles, architectural territories and operative methodologies. In this sense, the Master Plan operates as an interactive device and abstract machine, a living body that is, in the end, a subject of its own material evolution. The Master Plan as mediator promotes multi-scalar negotiations.

== Research and Innovation Tools ==
The interest in extending Architecture to multi-dimensional plans led Spinadel to develop instruments for multi-sector participation at various levels of approach to the city product. She is working on the future planning Urban Menus an Interactive Society Game to create our cities in 3D using a consensual approach. Spinadel was honored with the Granting Promotion XL Innovation aws Austria Wirtschaftsservice Gesellschaft of the Creative Industries (2017), the Impact Innovation funding from the Austrian Research Promotion Agency FFG (2020) and the Granting aws technology internationalization with URBAN MENUS India market study for a Smart Area Development solution (2021)

== Selected works ==
- Campus WU Vienna University of Economics and Business Administration Vienna II., Austria 2013
- Teaching Center Campus WU Vienna II., Austria 2013
- Housing Patchwork at the Hoffmannpark – Purkersdorf, Austria 2005
- Homeworkers at the Compact City Vienna XXI., Austria 2002
- Kindergarten at the Erlachplatz – Vienna X., Austria 1999

== Awards ==
At the XV International Biennial of Architecture of Buenos Aires BA 15, Spinadel won the BA 15 Award and also the Contest of the International Committee of Architectural Critics CICA 2015 in Urbanism. In 2015, she was honored with the Architecture Award of the City of Vienna. She is the first woman awarded 2014 with the Golden Ring of Honour of Vienna University of Economics and Business. Other prestigious awards and honors received by Laura P. Spinadel include: Ernst A. Plischke Award 2014, Otto Wagner Urban Design Award Az W PSK 1998, Outstanding Artist Award for Experimental Trends in Architecture BMUK 1989 among others.

== Museum exhibitions ==
- Indian Art House Gallery – Pune, India 2016
- Austrian Cultural Forum – Washington, USA 2015
- Centro Cultural Recoleta – Buenos Aires, Argentina 2013 2011
- Architekturzentrum Wien Vienna, Austria 2009
- Austrian Cultural Forum New York USA 2003
- Semper Depot Wien – Vienna, Austria 2003

== Bibliography ==
- Books by Laura P. Spinadel include Campus WU: A Holistic History – Editor BOA büro für offensive aleatorik – 2013 ISBN 978-3950366600; Urban unconscious – BUSarchitektur & Friends– Libria Editrice – 2003 ISBN 88-87202-44-3; Perceptions by BUSarchitektur – Projects and Buildings 1986/1999 Libria Editrice 2001 ISBN 88-87202-15-X
