= Erico Spinadel =

Austrian-Argentine industrial engineer (1929–2020)

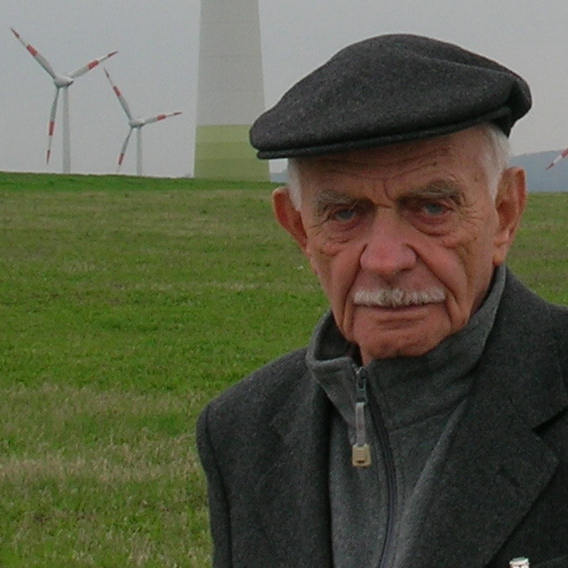
- Born: 6 May 1929; Vienna, Austria
- Died: 25 February 2020 (aged 90); Pinamar, Argentina
- Education: University of Buenos Aires
- Spouse: Vera W. de Spinadel
- Children: Laura P. Spinadel, Pablo Spinadel, Irene Spinadel, Andrea Gisela Spinadel

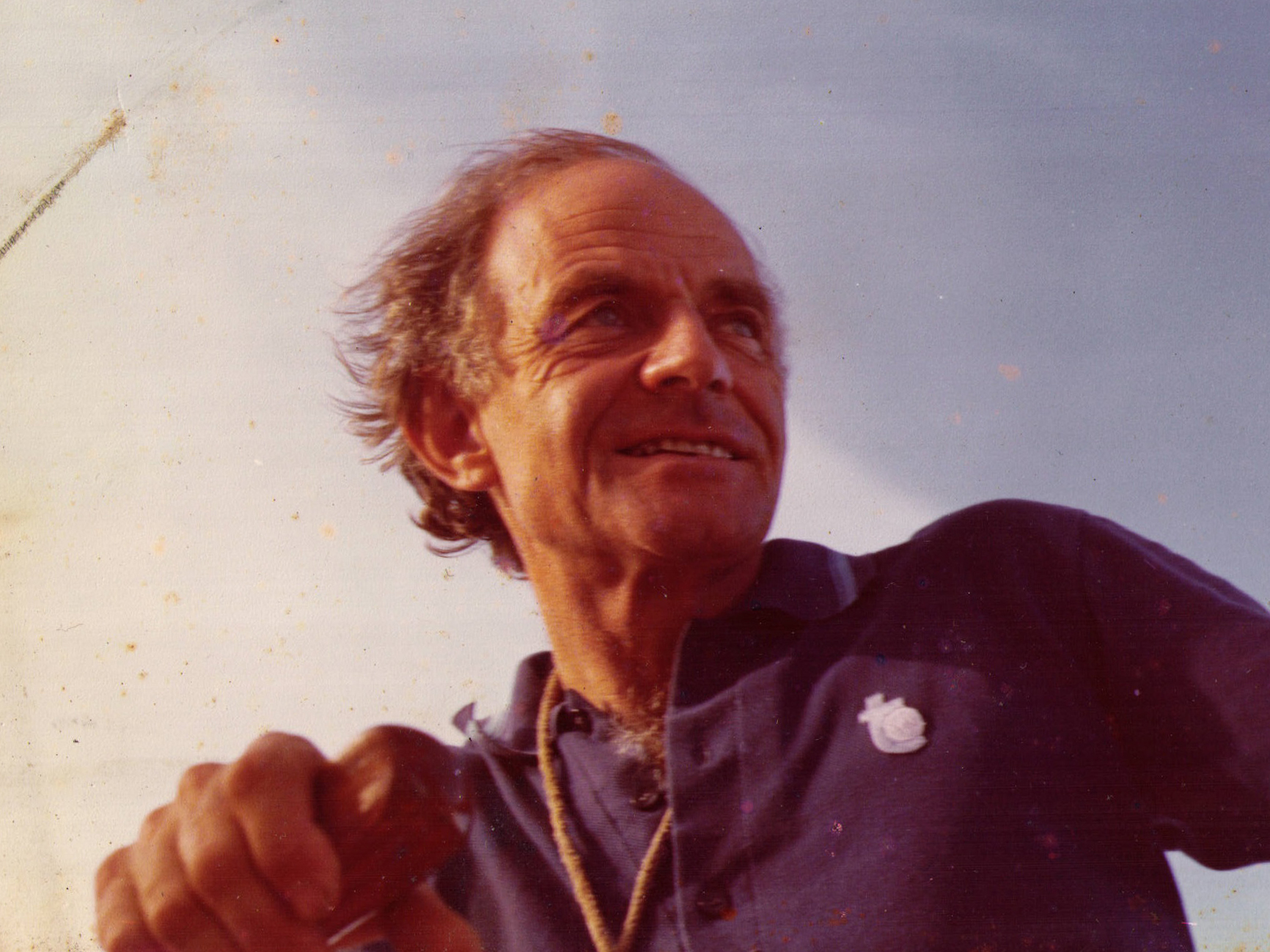
Erico Spinadel, Learning from the Wind

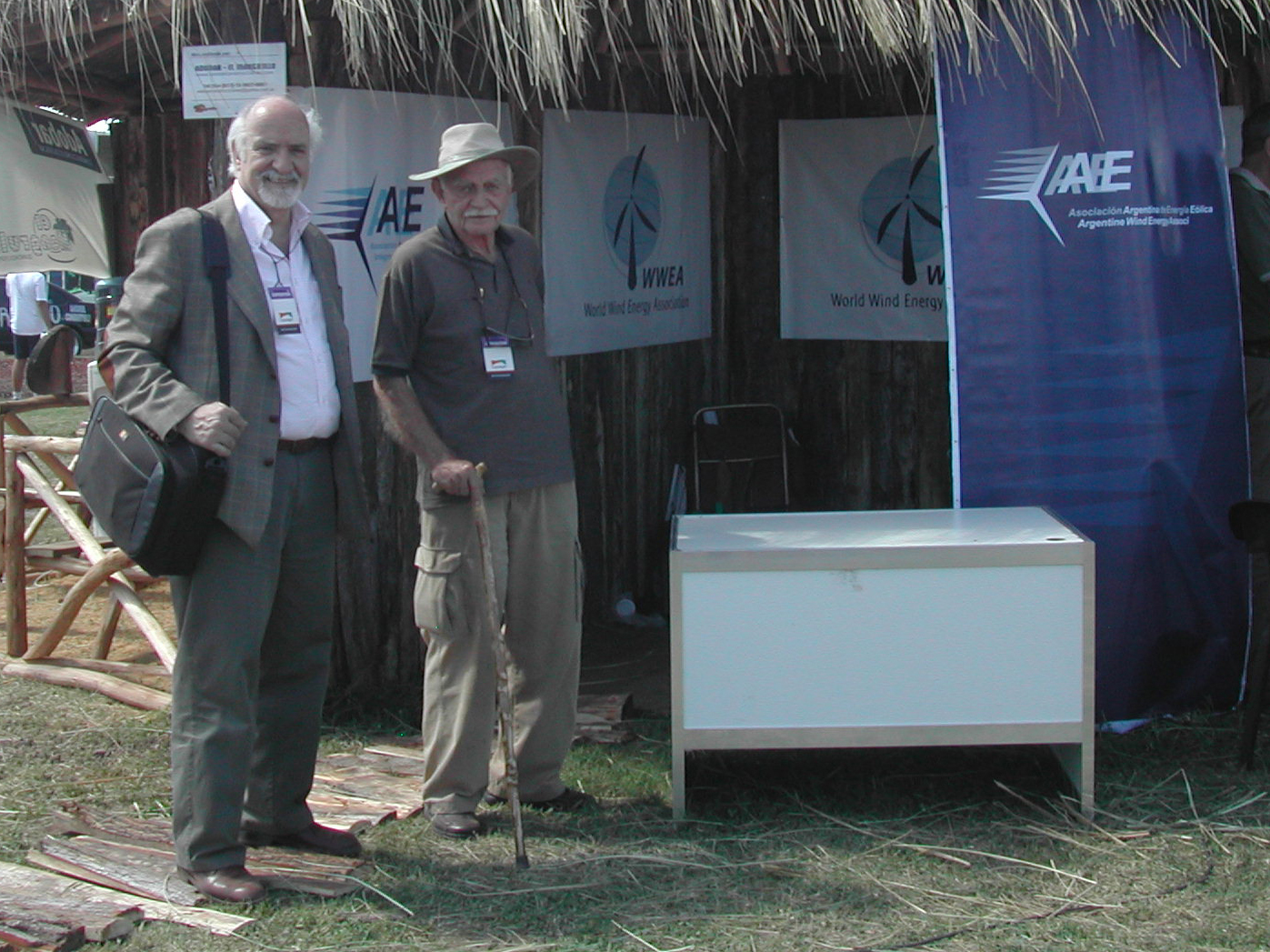
Erico Spinadel in International Fair

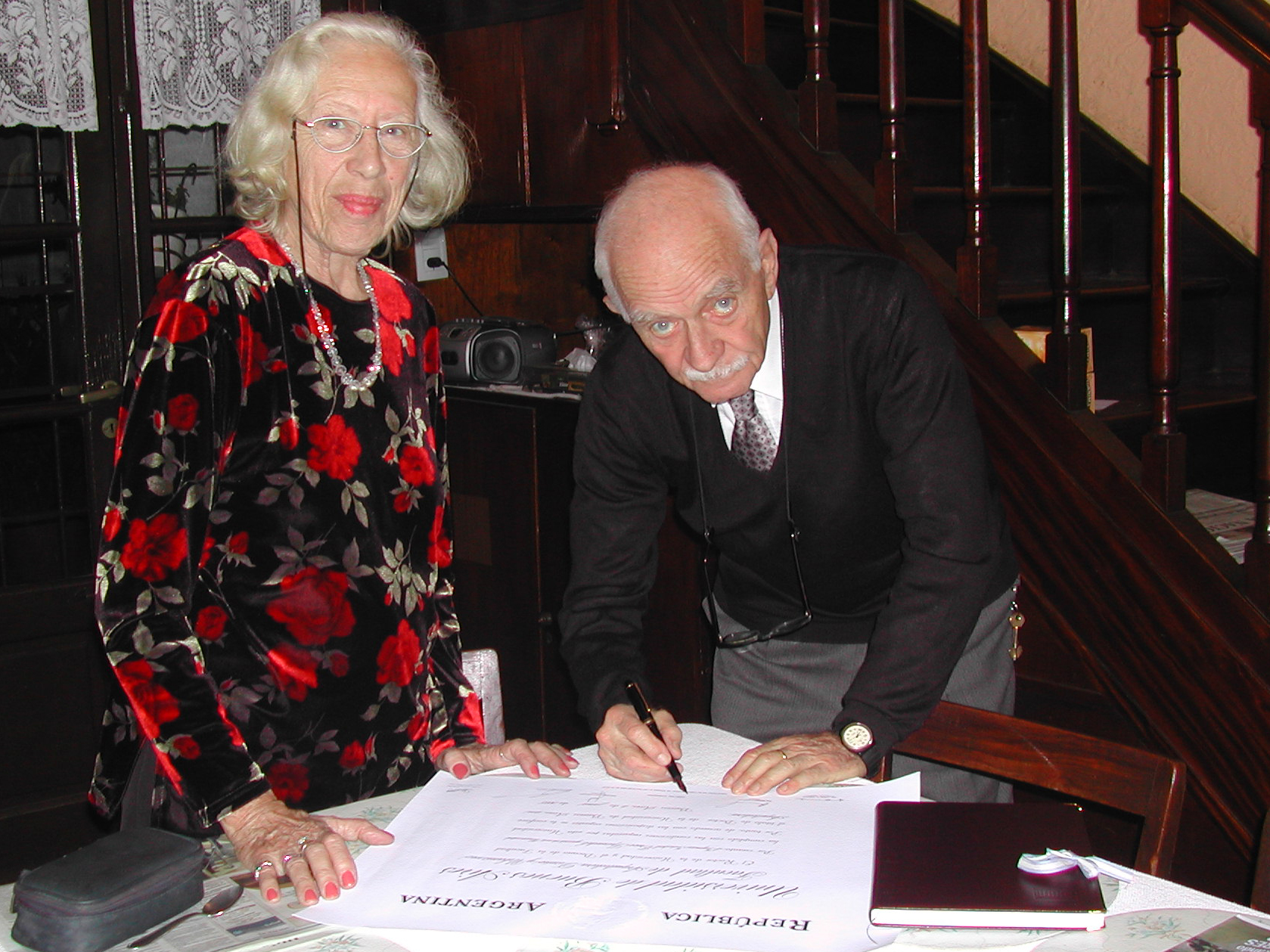
Erico Spinadel & Vera W. de Spinadel

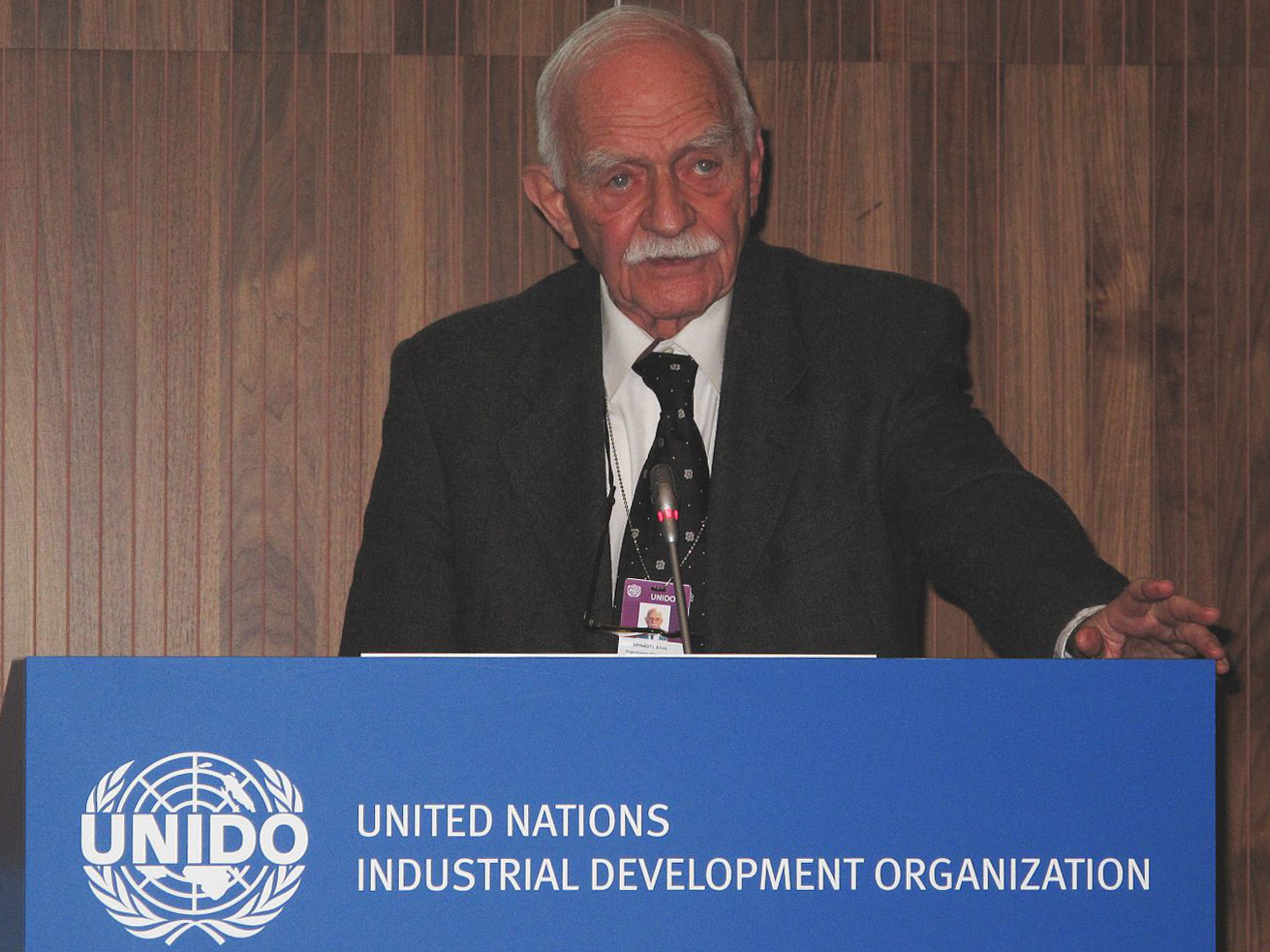
Erico Spinadel in UNIDO

Erico Spinadel (6 May 1929 – 25 February 2020) was an Austrian-born Argentine industrial engineer who specialized in wind power. Spinadel was born in Vienna, and obtained his PhD at the University of Buenos Aires, Argentina, in 2004.

Erico Spinadel joined the Argentine National Atomic Energy Commission (CNEA) in 1956 and in January 1959 he was the first operator to drive a nuclear reactor (the RA 1) to critical conditions. In this way, he started the use of nuclear energy in the southern hemisphere, generating electricity and also producing radioisotopes for hospitals and for industrial applications.

Between 1994 and 2001, he was a consulting full professor at the University of Buenos Aires, School of Engineering. From 1986 to 1994 he was Director of the Electricity Department of the School of Engineering, University of Buenos Aires FIUBA. From 1994 he was a consulting emeritus professor at the National University of Lujan. In 1994, he was President of the Argentine Wind Energy Association (AAEE). From 2008 he was Regional Director on the Latin American Wind Energy Association (LAWEA). and member of the board of the World Wind Energy Association He was Wind Energy consultant for the United Nations Industrial Development Organization UNIDO-ONUDI since 1992, at the special invitation of the respective Governments several missions in Indonesia and the Far East.

Dr. Erico Spinadel was a leader in the field of wind power in the research of a multidisciplinary systemic approach for developing countries got wide international recognition. He was the author of more than seven books and published more than 50 research papers. He died in Pinamar, Argentina.

He married Vera Martha Winitzky, a mathematician. The couple had 4 children: Laura, Pablo, Irene and Andrea.

== Books ==
- Electrical and Magnetic Circuits and Special Topics, Nueva Librería, Buenos Aires, Argentina. ISBN 950-0088-01-0, 1982
- Transformers, Nueva Librería, Buenos Aires, Argentina. ISBN 950-9088-09-9, 1984
- Electrical and Magnetic Circuits and Special Topics, 2nd expanded and revised edition, Nueva Librería, Buenos Aires, Argentina. ISBN 987-1104-25-1, 2004
- Transformers, 2nd expanded and revised edition, Nueva Librería, Buenos Aires, Argentina. ISBN 987-1104-14-6, 2004
- Wind Energy Systemic Multidisciplinary Approach, Nueva Librería, Buenos Aires, Argentina. ISBN 978-987-1104-74-1, 2009
- Wind Energy Systemic Multidisciplinary Approach 2, Nueva Librería, Buenos Aires, Argentina. ISBN 987-1871-31-7, 2015

== Papers ==
- Wind energy; Suggested possibilities for the Republic Argentina. Journal of engineering military year 5 No. 9. Author: E. Spinadel. PG.: 86–91. Registration of intellectual property 302506. SSN: 0326–5560, 1989
- Wind energy: farms or isolated points? Military engineering year 6 No. 10. Authors: E. Spinadel and C. Moon Pont. PG.: 66–70. Registration of intellectual property 302506. SSN: 0326–5560, 1990
- Wind Diesel Project in El Cuy, Argentine Patagonia – European Community Conference on Wind Energy Proceedings – ECWEC '90. Authors: E. Spinadel and C. Luna Pont. Pg. 49–54. ISBN 0-9510271-8-2, 1990
- Why do I say "Yes" now? Wind farms in Patagonia. Proceedings European Community Wind Energy Conference, ECWEC'93. Authors: E. Spinadel, C. Luna Pont, G. Dutt. Pg. 118–131. ISBN 0-9521452-0-0. Professor E. Spinadel was a member of the Scientific Committee, 1993
- Argentina Technology for Developing Countries commissioned by International Organism. Military Engineering magazine, Year 12, N°27. Author: E. Spinadel. Pg.: 34–36. Copyright Registry 124635. SSN: 0326–5560, 1995
- Aeolic-Electric Energy generated in the Patagonia transmitted to consumption centers following the hydrogen energy vector. Military Engineering magazine, Year 12, N°28. Author: E. Spinadel. Pg.: 30–36. Copyright Registry 124635. SSN: 0326–5560, 1996
- Aeolic-Electric Energy generated in the Patagonia transmitted to consumption centers following the hydrogen energy vector. Environment and Society magazine, N°3, 1996, CONAPAS. Authors: E. Spinadel, F. Gamallo y S. L. Gracia Nuñez. Pg.: 8–13. Copyright Registry 666267, 1996
- About the proper use of aids. Windpower Magazine, vol.12 n°11, Denmark. Author: E. Spinadel. Pg.: 4. ISSN 0109-7318, 1996
- The Transmission of Electric Energy Generated in Wind Farms in the Argentine Patagonia to the Consumption Centers using the Hydrogen Vector. Proceedings of EUWEC'96, Göteborg, Sweden, May. Authors: E. Spinadel, S. L. Gracia Nuñez, F. Gamallo. Pg. 472–475. ISBN 0-9521452-9-4. Author E. Spinadel was member of the Scientific Committee, 1996
- Wind Power Generators designed for Weak and Moderate Wind Conditions. Proceedings of European Union Wind Energy Conference, EUWEC'96. May. Authors: E. Spinadel, F. Gamallo, P. Spinadel. Pg.: 329–332. ISBN 0-9521452-9-4, 1996
- Wind Energy Export through Liquid Hydrogen. Military Engineering magazine, Year 14, N°32. January–April. Authors: E. Spinadel, F. Gamallo y S.L. Gracia Nuñez. Pg.: 14–16. Copyright Registry 669150. SSN: 0326–5560, 1997
- Wind Energy Export through Liquid Hydrogen. Environment and Society magazine, Year 2, N°8. May. Authors: E. Spinadel y F. Gamallo. Pg.: 6–9. Copyright Registry 666267, 1997
- Mathematical Model for Determining the Accumulated Hydrogen Reserve in Wind-Generated Electricity At Distant Sites. Proceedings of M&D'98, Second International Conference on Mathematics & Design 98, San Sebastián, Spain, 1–4 June. Pg. 333–340. ISBN 84-600-9459-6. Authors: V. Spinadel, F. Gamallo, E. Spinadel, 1998
- An Autonomous Wind-Hydrogen System for Electricity Services to Isolated Locations. Proceedings of XII World Hydrogen Energy Conference, Buenos Aires, 21–26 June de 1998. Volume 1, Pg. 777–782. ISBN 987-97075-0-8. Authors: F. Menzl, E. Spinadel, 1998
- Mathematical Model for determining the Accumulated Hydrogen Reserve in Wind-Generated Electricity at Distant Sites. Proceedings of XII World Hydrogen Energy Conference, Buenos Aires, 21–26 June. Volume 2. Pg.1719–1728. ISBN 987-97075-1-6. Authors: V. Spinadel, F. Gamallo, E. Spinadel, 1998
- Patagonian Wind Exported as Liquid Hydrogen. Proceedings of XII World Hydrogen Energy Conference, Buenos Aires, 21–26 June 1998. Volume 1. Pg. 369–376. ISBN 987-97075-3-2. Authors: E. Spinadel, F. Gamallo, S. Luis Gracia Nuñez, P. Spinadel, M. Cerviño, 1998
- Make better use of Wind Energy Primary Source in Argentina. Part 1. Electrotechnical Argentina magazine, Volume LXXXIV, January–February. Pg 30–34. ISSN 0370-7857. Author: E. Spinadel, 1998
- Make better use of Wind Energy Primary Source in Argentina. Part 2. Electrotechnical Argentina magazine, Volume LXXXIV, March–April. Pg 71–78.. ISSN 0370-7857. Author: E. Spinadel, 1998
- Home electric Energy from hydrogen and fuel cells. Authors: E.Spinadel, S.L.Gracia Nuñez, J.Maislin, R.Wurster, F.Gamallo. MW magazine, No.228, April, Pg.s. 72–76. Copyright Registry 173449. ISSN 0025-8180, 2000
- Defining Characteristics of a wind-electric Power Generator for Electrolyzes Alkaline. Authors: E.Alvarez, R.Class, J.Dalmaso, F.Gamallo, J.Maislin, E.Spinadel. Military Engineering Magazine, ISSN 0326-5560, Year 18, No.43, January–June., Pg: 36–37, 2001
- Home electric Energy from hydrogen and fuel cells. Authors: E.Spinadel, J.Maislin, F.Gamallo. MW Magazine ISSN 0325-352X, Year 24, No.242, June, Pg: 102–106, 2001
- Socio-economic determiners for a greater efficient utilization of a primary Energy source in Argentina. Authors: E.Spinadel, F.Gamallo. Megavatios Magazine ISSN 0325-352X, year 24, No.242, June, Pg.: 120–142, 2001
- Wind Power: a long-term investment. Author: E. Spinadel. Tecnoil Magazine RPI 324–856, year 23, Nº 232, October, Pg.: 54–60, 2001
- Mathematical Model for Optimizing Sizes of "PEM" Fuel Cells in Combined Natural Gas and Electricity Energy Supply. Authors: F. Gamallo; J. Maislin; E. Spinadel; Vera W. de Spinadel. M&D2001, The Third International Conference, Deakin University, Geelong, Australia. ISBN 0-7300-2526-8, Pg. 166 – 173, 2001
- Advantages of decentralized electricity and heat supply for buildings, using fuel cells. Author: Erico Spinadel. Presented in Symmetry: Art & Science, Brussels, Belgium. ISSN 1447-607X. Pg: 403–413, 2002
- Wind Energy in Argentina, Legislation, Economical & Technical Aspects. The World Wind Energy Association. The 1st World Wind Energy Conference, Berlin, Germany, 2–6 July 2002. Authors: E. Spinadel, J. Gil, F. Gamallo. ISBN 3-936338-11-6. Ext: 5 Pg. Published on CD, 2002
- An isolated wind-hydrogen system for the Martín García Island. 10º International Symposium REGWA, Nutzung Regenerativer Energiequellen und Wasserstofftechnik, University of Applied Sciences of Stralsund, Stralsund, Germany, November 2003. Author: E. Spinadel. Pg. 138 – 143, ISBN 3-9807963-6-1, 2003

== Awards ==
- Gold medal 30º university teaching FI UBA
- First prize in the BIEL light + building BIEL'95'Award
- Emeritus Professor National University of Luján, 2011
- Big Prize of the Civic Parliament of the Humanity to the Community Greatness granted to the Argentine Association of Wind Energy, 2010
