= Storm hardening =

Storm hardening is the process whereby construction is used to create new infrastructure or retrofit existing infrastructure such that it is more capable of withstanding extreme weather events. It "involves physically changing infrastructure to make it less susceptible to damage from extreme wind, flooding, or flying debris. Hardening measures include adopting new technology, installing new equipment, constructing protective barriers, or changing communications/IT at the facility.

"Hardening usually requires significant investment by the energy company. Some projects take years to complete; for example, large earth-moving equipment may be brought in to build a new levee. Sometimes the sheer magnitude of assets involved (e.g., thousands of wooden distribution poles) requires years of concerted effort to upgrade."
