= Sustainable urbanism =

Study of cities and the practices to build them

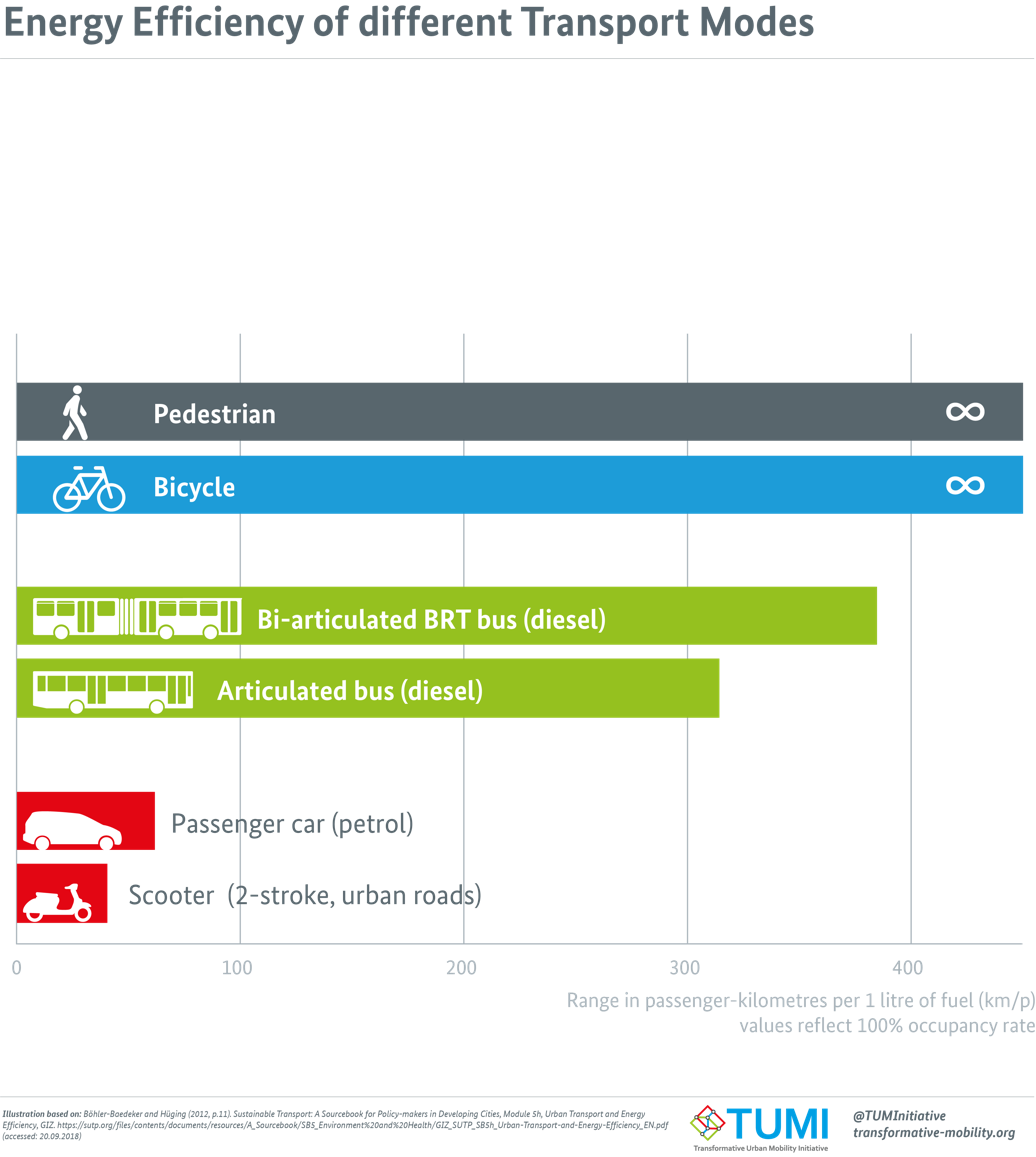
Energy efficiency of different transport modes.

Sustainable urbanism is both the study of cities and the practices to build them (urbanism), that focuses on promoting their long term viability by reducing consumption, waste, and harmful impacts on people and place while enhancing the overall well-being of both people and place. Well-being include the physical, ecological, economic, social, health and equity factors, among others, that comprise cities and their populations. In the context of contemporary urbanism, the term "cities" refers to several scales of human settlements from towns to cities, metropolises and mega-city regions, which include their peripheries, suburbs, and exurbs. Sustainability is a key component of professional practice in urban planning and urban design, along with its related disciplines of landscape architecture, architecture, and civil and environmental engineering. Green urbanism and ecological urbanism are other common terms that are similar to sustainable urbanism; however, they can be construed as focusing more on the natural environment and ecosystems and less on economic and social aspects. Also related to sustainable urbanism are the practices of land development called Sustainable development, which is the process of physically constructing sustainable buildings, and the practices of urban planning called smart growth or growth management, which denote the processes of planning, designing, and building urban settlements that are more sustainable than if they were not planned according to sustainability criteria and principles.

== Terminology ==
The origin of the term sustainable urbanism has been attributed to Professor Susan Owens of Cambridge University in the UK in the 1990s, according to her doctoral student and now professor of architecture Phillip Tabb. The first university graduate program named Sustainable Urbanism was founded by professors Michael Neuman and Phillip Tabb at Texas A&M University in 2002. There are now dozens of university programs with that name worldwide. As of 2018, there are hundreds of scholarly articles, books and publications whose titles contain the exact words sustainable urbanism and thousands of articles, books and publications that contain that exact term, according to Google Scholar.

In 2007, two important events occurred in the USA that furthered the knowledge base and diffusion of sustainable urbanism. First was the International Conference on Sustainable Urbanism at Texas A&M University in April, which drew nearly 200 persons from five continents. Second, later in the year, was the publication of the book Sustainable Urbanism by Doug Farr. According to Farr, this approach aims to eliminate environmental impacts of urban development by supplying and providing all resources locally. The full life cycle of services and public goods such as electricity and food are evaluated from production to consumption with the intent of eliminating waste or environmental externalities. Since that time, significant research and practice worldwide have broadened the term considerably to include social, economic, welfare and public health factors, among others, to the environmental and physical factors in the Farr book; thus taking it beyond an urban design field into all of urban planning, policy and development. Approaches that focus on the social and economic aspects use the terms fair cities and just cities. The United Nations has incorporated sustainable urbanism into its global sustainable development goals as goal 11, Sustainable Cities and Communities.

There are a range of organizations promoting and researching sustainable urbanism practices, including governmental agencies, non-governmental organizations, professional associations, universities and research institutes, philanthropic foundations and professional enterprises around the world. Related to sustainable urbanism is the Ecocity or Ecological Urbanism movement which is another approach that focuses on creating urban environments based on ecological principles, and the resilient cities movement which focuses on addressing depleting resources by creating distributed local resources to replace global supply chain in case of major disruption. As resilient cities thinking has evolved, it too has gone beyond climate change to incorporate resilient responses by hybrid urban-natural ecosystems such as city regions to natural disasters, war and conflict, economic shocks and crises, massive migration, and other shocks.

=== Sustainable Urbanism: Urban Design With Nature, by Doug Farr (2007) ===
The architect and urban planner Doug Farr discusses making cities walkable, along with combining elements of ecological urbanism, sustainable urban infrastructure, and new urbanism, and goes beyond them to close the loop on resource use and bring everything into the city or town. This approach is centered on increasing the quality of life by affording greater accessibility to activities and places within a short distance and by increasing the quality of products that are offered.

== Comparison of similar principles ==
New Urbanism emerged in the 1980s and was an early touchstone for sustainable urbanism, since it is based around bringing activities and land uses closer together, increasing urban and suburban densities, being more efficient in terms of infrastructure provision and transport energy use, and having more within walking distance. There were significant critiques of New Urbanism and its more international term Compact city that found it was a limited approach. Its principal conclusion was that the sustainability of a city could not be measured by form alone, and that processes were critical to measure sustainability. The criticism of New Urbanism is that it attempts to apply 19th century urban form to 21st century cities and that New Urbanism excludes economic diversity by creating expensive places to live that are highly privatized and controlled. Also, critics believe that, while the New Urbanism contains many attractive ideas, it may have difficulty dealing with a wide range of contemporary issues including scale, transportation, planning and codes, regionalism, and marketing.

Sustainable urbanism bridges the gaps of New Urbanism by including the factors listed in the lead paragraph of this Wikipedia entry.

Smart growth is a related approach to sustainable urbanism. As conceived by urban planners, it helps achieve greater jobs–housing balance, but it is likely to leave the sense of place unaddressed. While New Urbanism may fulfill that dimension of sense of place, it is not viewed as an approach that will lead to communities that are energy self-reliant. The ecological city approach seems to complementary to the other two approaches in terms of their respective areas of strengths and weakness.

Green urbanism probably contains the most similar ideas with sustainable urbanism. They both emphasize on interplay of cities with nature, as well as shaping better communities and lifestyles. However, the principles of green urbanism are based on the triple-zero framework: zero fossil-fuel energy use, zero waste, and zero emissions. Sustainable Urbanism, on the other hand, is more focused on designing communities that are walkable and transit-served so that people will prefer to meet their daily needs on foot.

== Defining elements of sustainable urbanism ==
=== Compactness ===
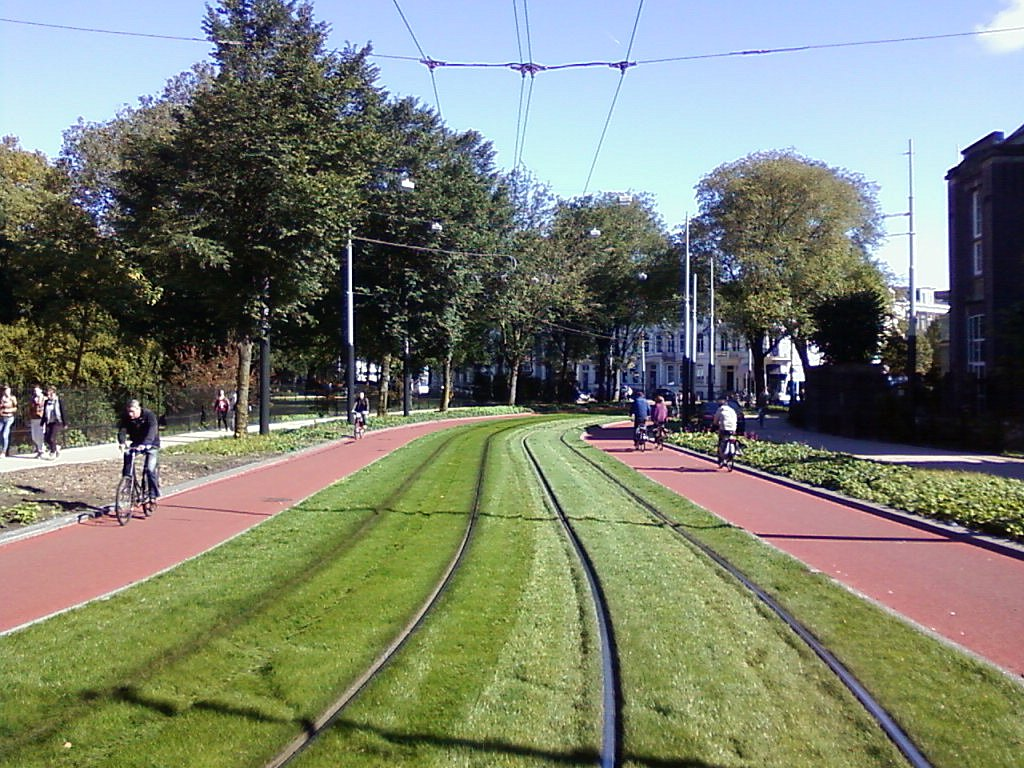
Green track alongside cycling and walking paths, trees and greenery in Amsterdam, Netherlands

Compactness, or density, plays an important yet limited role in sustainable urban development because it can support reductions in per-capita transport energy use by increasing walking, cycling, active transport and public transit use. The relatively low density of some urban and especially suburban and exurban development is too low to support efficient transit and walk-to destinations. Such low-density development is a characteristic of urban sprawl, which is the major cause of high dependence on private automobiles, inefficient infrastructure, increased obesity, loss of farmlands and natural habitats, pollution, and so on. For these reasons, sustainable urbanism tends to promote more compact development with greater intensities of use and greater variety of uses and activities in a given urban area.

Research has shown that low-density development can exacerbate non-point source pollutant loadings by consuming absorbent open space and increasing impervious surface area relative to compact development. While increasing densities regionally can better protect water resources at a regional level, higher-density development can create more impervious cover, which increases water quality problems in nearby or adjacent water bodies.

Increasing neighborhood population density also supports improved public transit service. Concentrating development density in and around transit stops and corridors maximizes people's willingness to walk and thus reduces car ownership and use. Sustainable urbanism seeks to integrate infrastructure design increase with density, because a concentrated mixed-use development required less per capita infrastructure usage compared to detached single-family housing.

=== Biophilia and Biophilic Cities ===
The Biophilia hypothesis was introduced by E. O. Wilson. It refers to the connection between humans and other living systems. Within this concept, humans are biologically predisposed to caring for nature. Biophilic cities are those that bring nature into the city by increasing parks and open spaces, green and blue corridors, and networks that link them. Increasingly, biophilia refers to habitats that support other species, sustainable food production and urban agriculture. Thus, biophilia and biophilic cities are an underlying component of sustainable urbanism.

=== Sustainable corridors ===
Sustainable corridors are similar to a wildlife corridor in that they connect one area to another efficiently, cheaply, and safely. They allow people to pass from their immediate proximity to another without relying on cars or other wasteful and inefficient products. It also relies on accessibility to all people in the community so that the mode of transportation is the most convenient and easiest to use for everyone. Sustainable corridors also include biodiversity corridors to allow animals to move around communities so that they may still live in and around cities.

=== High performance buildings ===
High performance buildings are designed and constructed to maximize operational energy savings and minimize environmental impacts of the construction and operation of the buildings. Building construction and operation generates a great deal of ‘externalized costs’ such as material waste, energy inefficiencies and pollution. High performance buildings aim to minimize these and make the process much more efficient and less harmful. New York City Department of Design & Construction put out a set of guidelines in April 1999 on High performance buildings that have broad application to sustainable urbanism as a whole worldwide.

By incorporating environmentally sound materials and systems, improving indoor air quality and using natural or high efficiency lighting, it minimizes a building impact on its natural surroundings; additionally, those who work or live in these buildings directly benefit from these differences. Some building owners have even reported increased worker productivity as a result of the improved conditions. However, because these other benefits are more difficult to quantify than direct energy savings, the real value of high performance buildings can easily be underestimated by traditional accounting methods that do not recognize ‘external’ municipal and regional costs and benefits. The cost evaluations of high performance building should account for the economic, social, and environmental benefits that accompany green buildings.

- Energy efficiency/clean energy resources

Reduce energy use and demand through passive solar techniques and integrated building design. This process looks at optimum orientation and maximizes the thermal efficiency of the building envelope (windows, walls, roof) while also considering the interaction of the HVAC, lighting, and control systems. Integrated design uses daylight to reduce electrical demand, and incorporates energy efficient lighting, motors, and equipment. Where feasible, renewable energy sources such as photovoltaic cells, solar hot water, and geothermal exchange are used in tandem with other low emission technologies, such as fuel cells. This results in direct energy cost savings (fuel and electricity) yield a good rate of return based on the initial investment. Other external benefits include improved air quality from reduced fuel consumption (limiting nitrous oxide, sulfur dioxide, methane, and other gases that contribute to air pollution). Additionally, reducing the overall aggregate electrical load significantly reduces carbon dioxide emissions.

- Improved indoor environment

Improve indoor air quality by eliminating unhealthy emissions – such as volatile organic compounds (VOCs) – from building materials, products, and furnishings, and through outside filtering and distribution techniques that control pollutants. Maximize the use of controlled daylighting, which can then be augmented by high quality artificial lighting. Provide good acoustic control. Results in high performance facilities can help address a wide range of human resource concerns by improving the total quality of the interior environment. In addition, attention to building wellness today helps avoid future costs of corrections. Such ‘well building’ design emphasis can improve occupant comfort, health, and well-being, in turn reducing employee absenteeism and turnover.

- Source reduction, pollution prevention and recycling

Renewable resources, and are themselves recyclable, and that have been manufactured in a manner less damaging to the environment. Implement construction and demolition (C&D) waste prevention/management strategies and selective site sorting of materials for salvage, recycling, or disposal. These actions will prevent unnecessary depletion of natural resources and will reduce air, water, and soil pollution. They will also strengthen the market for recycled materials, and the manufacture of products with post-consumer content. Long-term, better C&D waste management can reduce waste disposal costs, ease stress on landfills, and minimize the cost of transporting waste to disposal facilities outside the city.

=== High performance infrastructure ===
High-performance infrastructure refers to core best management practices (BMPs) applicable to the typical section of the public right-of-way, encompassing street sidewalk, underground utilities, stormwater infrastructure, landscapes, and streetscape elements. In addition to many public health and environmental benefits, financial benefits include decreased first costs, decreased operation and maintenance costs, decreased energy costs and increased real estate values.

- Component optimization

At the single-component level, standard details may be improved to optimize performance, minimize environmental impact, use materials more efficiently or extended lifecycle. Examples include using reclaimed supplementary cement materials to increase pavement strength or designing water-efficient landscapes to reduce irrigation needs and water consumption.

- Multifunctional optimization

Improving single components does not consider the whole system in place, so multifunctional optimization guidelines seek to minimize conflicts among parts and promote synergies. This could lead to long-term savings, improved performance and lifecycle, and increased returns on municipal investments. One example is using permeable pavement to reduce stormwater runoff and peak demand on stormwater management infrastructure while providing an adequate driving surface for vehicles.

- Integrated design

Systems-oriented design focuses on improving the performance of the entire roadway system. It requires cross-disciplinary teamwork at the planning, scoping, design and construction phases. It promotes comprehensive performance improvements, compounds environmental benefits and potentially offers substantial cost savings. An example of integrated design would be designing a roadway with a diversely planted center median that functions as both a traffic-calming device and a stormwater bioretention area to improve pedestrian safety, minimize stormwater runoff, dampen street noise and improve air quality.

== Examples of sustainable urbanism ==
Current leading examples as of 2018, which need to be described and explained here in greater detail, include the Hammarby Sjöstad district in Stockholm, Sweden, Freiburg, Germany, BedZED in Hackbridge, Sutton England, a suburb of London, and Serenbe near Atlanta, Georgia in the US.

=== Newington, Sydney, Australia ===
A suburb in western Sydney, Australia, Newington, was the home to the athletes of the 2000 Summer Olympics and 2000 Summer Paralympics. It was built on a brownfield site, and it was developed by Mirvac Lend Lease Village Consortium from 1997. Redevelopment of the village was completed in 1999, but further development is still occurring. After the Games, Newington stimulated the Australian market for green products, and it became a solar village housing approximately 5,000 people. Unfortunately, the development failed to build neighborhood centers with walk-to services, which perpetuates automobile dependence. Furthermore, Newington does not provide any affordable housing.

Key Sustainable Urbanism Thresholds:

- High performance buildings: Solar panels are installed in every home in Newington. “At the time of its construction it was the largest solar village in the world… The collective energy generated by these photovoltaic panels will prevent 1,309 tons of CO_{2} from entering the atmosphere per year, the equivalent of 262 cars being taken off the road." By using window awnings, wool insulation, slab construction, and efficient water fixtures, over 90 percent of the homes are designed to consume 50 percent less energy and water than conventional homes.
- Sustainable corridors and biophilia: At Newington, 90 percent of the plantings are native species. 21 acres of the development site is incorporated into the Millennium Parklands. 40 percent of stormwater runoff infiltrates the groundwater supply and the rest is cleansed on-site and channeled to the ponds in the Parklands, providing important habitats. In addition, The Haslams Creek was rehabilitated from a concrete channel to a natural watercourse.

=== Dongtan, Shanghai, China ===
Dongtan is a development in Eastern Chongming Island, which is roughly a one-hour trip from downtown Shanghai. It was once planned as “the world’s first eco-city,” attempting to become an energy self-sufficient, carbon-neutral, and mostly car-free eco-city housing 500,000 residents. The first phase of the development is supposed to complete by 2010, and entire development by 2050, but the Dongtan project has been delayed indefinitely due to financial issues, among other things. Over 33% of industrial and 66% of municipal wastewater went untreated, leaving 60% of China's major rivers unsafe for human contact. Urban air pollution was linked to roughly 300,000 premature deaths each year. Prioritizing the implementation of Local Agenda 21 enabled regional capacity building and sustainable development frameworks.

Key sustainable urbanism thresholds:

- Compactness: Dongtan is planned to achieve densities of 84-112 people per acre, which will support efficient mass transit, social infrastructure, and a range of businesses. Most homes will mid-rise apartment buildings clustered toward the city center. Parks, lakes and other public open space will be scattered around the densely designed neighborhoods.
- High performance Infrastructures: Dongtan is designed to utilize various types of renewable energy, coming as close as possible to carbon neutrality. Wind turbines with different scales and solar panels will produce most of the energy Dongtan will need. The most ambitious portion of the energy infrastructure is the combined heat and power system (CHP), converting waste from different sources into energy, including sewage, compost, organic waste such as rice husks.

=== Upton, Northampton, England ===
Upton is part of the southwest district of Northampton, England, lying between the existing town edge and the motorway. Originally farming land, Upton was developed by English Partnerships, the national regeneration agency for England, with high standards of building and design codes. The planning outline started in 1997, and the sites were planned to be completed by 2011.

Key sustainable urbanism thresholds:

- High performance buildings and infrastructure: The Upton development is planned to employ sustainable urban drainage systems (SUSD), controlling the flow and quality of water entering the sewage system. Other green technologies being implemented include green roofs, microcombined heat and power (micro-CHP), rainwater harvesting systems, and PV systems.
- Sustainable Neighborhoods: Upton is currently developing its transit system. As soon as the first residents move in, a twice-hourly bus service will begin running in the neighborhoods. A car sharing program is also proposed. The development is achieving its social sustainability by requiring that 22 percent of scattered units be permanently affordable housing.

=== Curitiba, Brazil ===
Curitiba, located in southern Brazil, is known for its integrated urban planning and ecological management initiatives initiated in the late 1960s. The city's planning framework coordinates transportation, land use, and environmental protection.

Key sustainable urbanism thresholds:

- Integrated Public Transport (Bus Rapid Transit): Curitiba developed a Bus Rapid Transit (BRT) system utilizing dedicated lanes, tubular boarding stations, and pre-payment systems. The system provides high-capacity public transit with the aim of maintaining high ridership and reducing private vehicle dependency.
- Ecological Flood Management and Parks: Rather than constructing concrete drainage canals for heavy rainfall management, Curitiba converted flood-prone river valleys into a network of linear parks containing excavated lakes. These areas function as natural drainage basins that absorb and slow stormwater runoff to mitigate downstream flooding while increasing public green space.
- Social and Waste Integration: The city implemented programs such as the "Green Exchange" (Câmbio Verde), which permits residents to exchange sorted recyclable waste for fresh produce or bus tokens. This program aims to reduce landfill waste, support local agriculture, and provide food assistance.

== Sustainable urbanism organizations ==
Transition Town movement works to promote citizen based resilience to transition to a low carbon future.

Eco-City Builders holds a bi-annual conference on sustainable urbanism and promotes high performance planning and urban design practices.

The IGLUS Project at EPFL is a global action research network which is aimed at improving performance of cities in the areas of efficiency, resilience and sustainability by promoting more innovative governance approaches in urban infrastructure systems.

The Eco Cities Project at the University of Manchester (UK) is a research organization developing and validating sustainable urbanism practices.

Biophilic Cities Network.

The Institute for Sustainable Cities (New York City) works with the City of New York and residents to promote sustainable urbanism practices and policies.

International Council for Local Environmental Initiatives (ICLEI) supports policy, good governance, and local governmental practices to improve sustainability and resilience. They are working on four specific sustainable urbanism initiatives: (a) Resilient Communities and Cities, (b) Just and Peaceful Communities, (c) Viable Local Economies, and (d) Eco-efficient Cities.

The United Nations Habitat promotes sustainable urbanism practices around the globe to localize Agenda 21 with the UNEP. The Sustainable Cities Programme was established in 1990 as a joint UN-HABITAT/UNEP agency.

The Stockholm Resilience Center promotes practices to allow cities and places to adapt to climate change and resource depletion through sustainability practices.

=== LEED-ND ===
- The LEED for Neighborhood Development (LEED-ND) is the United States' first rating system for green neighborhoods. The LEED-ND was created out of a partnership with the Congress for New Urbanism, the U.S. Green Building Council (USGBC), and the Natural Resource Defense Council (NRDC). It provides a coordinated environmental strategy to achieve sustainability at the level of entire neighborhoods and communities. LEED-ND is a rating system that certifies green neighborhoods, building off USGBC's Leadership in Energy and Environmental Design (LEED), which is a third-party verification system that a development meets high standards of environmental responsibility. LEED-ND combines the principles of new urbanism, green building, and smart growth to create the first accepted national standard for neighborhood design that extends LEED's scope beyond the individual to a more holistic (neighborhood/community) perception of the context of the buildings.

== Criticism ==
There are professionals who are concerned that the use "Sustainable urbanism" as a label risks debasing the term "sustainable", with developments being labeled as examples of "Sustainable Urbanism", which, while substantially better than much modern development, are not truly sustainable according to the Brundtland definition of sustainability, taken from the landmark 1987 United Nations Report on Environment and Development titled Our Common Future: Report of the World Commission on Environment and Development.

== See also ==
- Circles of Sustainability
- Co-benefits of climate change mitigation
- Environmental planning
- List of most-polluted cities by particulate matter concentration
- Naked street
- Right to mobility
- SmartCode
- Sustainability
  - Sustainable development
    - Sustainable city
- Urban forest inequity
- Urban forest
- Urban forestry
- Urban green space
- Urban reforestation
- Urban resilience
- Urban vitality
- Walking city
- Water-sensitive urban design

Transport:

- Bicycle-friendly – Urban planning prioritising cycling
- Cycling mobility – Bicycling as transportation
- Transit mall – Urban street reserved for public transit, bicycles, and pedestrians
- Transit-oriented development – Urban planning prioritising transit
- Pedestrian village – Urban planning for mixed-use areas prioritising pedestrians
- Walkability – How accessible a space is to walking
