= Form-based code =

Type of land development regulation

A Form-Based Code (FBC) is a means of regulating land development to achieve a specific urban form. Form-Based Codes foster predictable built results and a high-quality public realm by using physical form (rather than separation of uses) as the organizing principle, with less focus on land use, through municipal regulations. Considering the relationship of buildings to the streetscape, allowing for cohesive, walk-accessible, and economically productive neighbourhoods. An FBC is a regulation, not a mere guideline, adopted into city, town, or county law and offers a powerful alternative to conventional zoning regulation. This streamlines land development projects by reducing bureaucratic barriers and fostering organic growth that evolves alongside community needs that is more responsive.

Rooted in established urban design principles that prioritize human-scale environments, pedestrian accessibility, and efficient land use. By focusing on the spatial relationships between buildings, streets, and public spaces rather than rigid land-use classifications, Form-Based zoning fosters vibrant, walkable communities. This approach aligns with key urban planning concepts such as New Urbanism, Transit-Oriented Development (TOD), and the 15-minute city model, all of which emphasize Mixed-Use neighbourhoods, active transportation, and reduced car-dependency. Cities adopting Form-Based codes often see significant improvements to their street connectivity, more efficient use of public infrastructure, and more accessible city due to the seamless integration of commercial, residential, and civic spaces.

Form-Based Codes are a new response to the modern challenges of urban sprawl, deterioration of historic neighborhoods, and neglect of pedestrian safety in new development. Tradition has declined as a guide to development patterns, and the widespread adoption by cities of single-use zoning regulations has discouraged compact, walkable urbanism. Form-Based Codes are a tool to address these deficiencies, and to provide local governments the regulatory means to achieve development objectives with greater certainty.

== Scope ==
Form-Based Codes address the relationship between building facades and the public realm, the form and mass of buildings in relation to one another, and the scale and types of streets and blocks. The regulations and standards in Form-Based Codes, presented in both diagrams and words, are keyed to a regulating plan that designates the appropriate form and scale (and therefore, character) of development rather than only distinctions in land-use types. This is in contrast to conventional zoning's focus on the micromanagement and segregation of land uses, and the control of development intensity through abstract and uncoordinated parameters (e.g., floor area ratios, dwelling units per acre, setbacks, parking ratios) to the neglect of an integrated built form. Not to be confused with design guidelines or general statements of policy, form-based codes are regulatory, not advisory.

Form-Based Codes are drafted to achieve a community vision based on time-tested forms of urbanism. Ultimately, a Form-Based Code is a tool; the quality of development outcomes is dependent on the quality and objectives of the community plan that a code implements.

== History ==
Form-Based Codes are part of a long history of shaping the built landscape. Such efforts go back to the urban designs of Hippodamus of Miletus, the planning of cities in ancient China, and Roman town planning. The Laws of the Indies, promulgated by the Spanish Crown starting in the 16th century, established some basic urban form requirements for colonial towns in the Americas. William Penn When planning Philadelphia in the 17th century did not shy from precise urban form requirements when he said, "Let every house be in a line, or upon a line, as much as may be."

During the 18th century, Baroque urban design commonly brought buildings to the fronts of their lots with common facade treatments. Baron Haussmann, appointed by Napoleon III to oversee the redevelopment of Paris in the 19th century, stipulated precise ratios of building heights to street widths; disposition and sizes of windows and doors on building facades; consistent planting of street trees; and standardization of material colors to bring unity and harmony to the public environment.

With the introduction of the car gaining popularity in the early 1900s, relatively close to the advancement of the Industrial Revolution and colonial cities of America beginning to develop, zoning focused on single-use districts that were intended to prevent land-use conflicts. This traditional North American method of zoning—often called the "Suburban Experiment" due to their radical yet unproven overhaul of city planning—enforces the Use-Based approach that rigidly separates residential, commercial, and industrial areas, diving by use and density.

=== Emergence ===
Regulating urban form is a challenge in modern democracies. Design guidelines adopted by municipalities, without legal enforceability, often invite capricious observance, thus failing to produce the comprehensive changes required to produce satisfying public places. When public planning exercises fail to produce predictable results, citizens often rebel against any development. In addition, from early in the twentieth century to the present, attempts at regulating the built landscape have usually been done for reasons that neglect community form, that are more concerned with the uses of property and impacts of scale than the form that development takes. And a planning profession that in recent decades has focused on policy, neglecting design, encouraged an abstract intellectual response to problems that are largely physical in nature.

The development of modern Form-Based Codes was started by architects, urban designers, and physical planners frustrated by the ineffectiveness of past criticisms of sprawl development and the failure of critics to propose realistic alternatives. These professionals, used to thinking physically about community problems, began the search for systematic physical solutions in the 1970s. Architect Christopher Alexander published A Pattern Language in 1977, a compendium of physical rules for designing humane buildings and places. Ian McHarg developed systematic mapping tools to encourage deliberate development patterns sensitive to local environmental conditions. Traditional Neighborhood Development ordinances were drafted beginning in the early 1990s as sets of development regulations to promote traditional neighborhood forms in new development projects. TND ordinances were typically adopted as an optional regulatory procedure that developers could request in place of conventional zoning. But their design regulations were not mapped to parcels or streets in advance, so lacked predictability of outcomes; TND ordinances proved to be an instructive effort, but showed few results.

Meanwhile, the accelerating scale of worldwide urban growth and the rapid expansion of the extent of cities heightened the need for regulatory tools better equipped to deal with such growth. The first serious attempt at creating a modern form-based code was done in 1982 to guide the development of the Florida resort town of Seaside by the husband and wife design team of Andres Duany and Elizabeth Plater-Zyberk. Realizing that designing an entire town would be an overwhelming task and would in the end lack the visual serendipity that only comes from myriad creative minds at work, they created a design code that established basic physical standards mapped to parcels, and then invited developers and architects to put their own distinctive stamp on their projects—but operating within those standards. The Seaside Code proved very successful; the resulting development of the town of Seaside is widely recognized as one of the most important and appealing planning efforts of the post-World War II era.

Duany/Plater-Zyberk's codes and the work of subsequent form-based code practitioners are not top-down mandates from imperial designers as in the baroque era or the wishful thinking of design guidelines that lack enforceability, but are instead legal regulations adopted by units of local government. As regulations they possess police power; violators of the regulations can be cited, and their invocation or retraction must go through a legislative process. As such, the community plays a more forceful role in shaping its physical future.

=== Impact on Housing and Affordability ===
Form-Based codes encourage housing diversity by removing restrictive zoning barriers that prioritize single-family homes. Traditional Use-Based zoning often limits the construction of multi-unit housing in residential areas, contributing to urban sprawl and housing shortages. In contrast, Form-Based codes allow for a mix of housing types—including missing middle housing such as townhouses—within walkable, mixed-use neighbourhoods. This flexibility not only increases the housing supply, but also makes cities more affordable by reducing artificial land constraints. Cities such as Portland, Oregon USA have successfully used form-based codes to encourage housing development using Accessory Dwelling Units (ADU), fostering economically diverse and inclusive communities.

Form-based codes produce more consistent and predictable patterns of development in relationship to the public realm than typically achieved through conventional zoning regulations.

=== Recent developments ===
Although the Seaside code was commissioned by a private developer, most current codes are commissioned by counties and municipalities. Since Seaside, the scale of Form-Based Coding projects has grown. Form-Based Coding can be applied at many scales, from a two-block main street to a county-wide region. An early Form-Based Code was adopted for downtown West Palm Beach in 1995. A significant code for a major urban arterial, the Columbia Pike in Arlington County, Virginia, was adopted in 2003 (Ferrell Madden Associates). A regional FBC was adopted in 2006 by St. Lucie County, Florida (Spikowski Associates, Dover-Kohl Partners). Duany/Plater-Zyberk has drafted a model FBC that is also a transect-based code that can be calibrated for local needs—the SMARTCODE. Its first attempted customization was done for Vicksburg, Mississippi in 2001 (Mouzon & Greene). The lessons learned there led to the first California adoption of a citywide Form-Based Code for the City of Sonoma in March 2003 (Crawford Multari & Clark Associates, Moule & Polyzoides), followed on June 16, 2003, by the first SmartCode adopted in the U.S., for central Petaluma, California (Fisher and Hall Urban Design, Crawford Multari & Clark Associates). SmartCodes are now being calibrated for Miami, Florida and Hurricane Katrina ravaged communities in Mississippi and Louisiana, along with cities as diverse as Taos, NM, Michigan City, IN, Jamestown, RI, Lawrence, KS, New Castle, DE, and Bran, Romania. Planetary climate change that must be mitigated by changes in the human environment will no doubt be an inducement to form-based and transect-based coding in the future.

The Cincinnati Form-Based Code adopted in 2013 is designed to be applied citywide in an incremental way, neighborhood by neighborhood. The code establishes transect zones and specifies standards for transects, building types, frontage types, walkable neighborhoods, and thoroughfares that can be adapted to each neighborhood.

Beaufort County, South Carolina adopted one of the first multijurisdictional Form-Based Codes at the end of 2014: In 2010, the County, the City of Beaufort and the City of Port Royal came together to hire Opticos Design, Inc. in Berkeley, California to draft the code.

The non-profit Form-Based Codes Institute was created in 2004 to establish standards and best practices for form-based codes. In Spring 2014, a new graduate-level studio dedicated to Form-Based Coding was launched at California State Polytechnic University, Pomona, entitled "Form-Based Codes in the Context of Integrated Urbanism".

== See also ==
- Zoning in the United States
- Development control in the United Kingdom
- Statutory planning
