= Jaime Correa =

Jaime Correa is the name of

- Jaime Correa (architect) (born 1957), urban planner, architect, and professor at the University of Miami
- Jaime Correa (footballer) (born 1979), Mexican footballer
- Jaime Correa (actor)
