= Ecological urbanism =

Theory of urbanism

Ecological urbanism draws from ecology to inspire an urbanism that is more socially inclusive and sensitive to the environment. It is less ideologically driven than green urbanism or sustainable urbanism. In many ways, ecological urbanism is an evolution and a critique of landscape urbanism, which argues for a more holistic approach to the design and management of cities. This type of urbanism has a central scope of four main objectives: compactness, complexity, efficiency, and stability. This model of urbanism strives to tackle the current challenges of society by intertwining sustainability and urban occupation models.

== Etymology ==
"Ecological urbanism" was coined by architect and planner Miguel Ruano in his 1998 book Eco-Urbanism: Sustainable Human Settlements, 60 Case Studies. The term first appeared as "EcoUrbanism", which is defined as "the development of multi-dimensional sustainable human communities within harmonious and balanced built environments". The term was used later in April 2003 at a conference at the University of Oregon, and again in 2006 in a paper by Jeffrey Hou. Mohsen Mostafavi used the term in the 2007 publication Intervention Architecture and in a lecture at the Canadian Centre for Architecture. Today, ecological urbanism is recognized as a formal academic research topic. Notably, the Harvard University Graduate School of Design has conducted a conference, held an art exhibition, and published a book all centered on ecological urbanism.

== Scholarship ==
Arguing for a "new ethics and aesthetics of the urban," the 656-page Ecological Urbanism book, edited by Mohsen Mostafavi with Gareth Doherty, was published in May 2010 by Lars Müller Publishers (ISBN 978-3-03778-189-0). The book follows the conference, and exhibition, held at the GSD in 2009. The book has a long list of contributors, including Rem Koolhaas, Homi K. Bhabha, Mitchell Joachim, Andrea Branzi, and about 130 others. A blog during the conference is part of the book. According to Architecture Today, the book is "one of the few books that recognises and articulates how, if this systems-based approach is to be successful, it needs to design, integrate and express complex systems and social processes in ways that are fundamentally humane." The book has been reviewed and cited in many publications, including [Metropolis Magazine], The Journal of Landscape Architecture, and Cities magazine. Events and discussions on the book have been held at the 2010 Venice Biennale, the Storefront for Art and Architecture in New York, and at the Van Alen Institute in New York.

In his introduction to the Ecological Urbanism, "Why Ecological Urbanism? Why Now?", extracted in Topos: The International Review of Landscape Architecture and Urban Design, Mostafavi asks: "Increased numbers of people and cities go hand in hand with a greater exploitation of the world’s limited resources. Every year, more cities are feeling the devastating impacts of this situation. What are we to do? What means do we have as designers to address this challenging reality?

Jeb Brugmann in his book Welcome to the Urban Revolution: How Cities Are Changing the World (Bloomsbury Press, 2009) says we need to become "masters of a stable, just, and ecological urbanism." For Brugmann, "The first step towards ecological urbanism is increasing the energy and nutrient productivity within the city, but the only way to move sufficiently from extractive mode to a sustainable productive mode is to think, design, and develop at the scale of the City."

There have been a number of recent conferences and lectures on the project of ecological urbanism, including: The New Aesthetics and Ecological Urbanism at Peking University in October 2010, New Zealand Institute of Landscape Architects Spring Lecture Series: Ecological Urbanism: A Prospectus for the Super City, in October 2010. The University of Washington’s urban initiative included a seminar on Now Urbanism and talks "on Ecological Urbanism, Ecological Design for Healthy Cities, Networked Urbanism, and America’s War on Immigrants". Eco-Urbanism: towards sustainable city living, was hosted by Nottingham University at the Shanghai Expo in August 2010.

In addition to courses at the GSD in 2008 and 2011, there have been courses on ecological urbanism at the Bergen School of Architecture, Oslo School of Architecture and Design, and Yale University. It is on numerous course syllabi, including Advanced Design Theories 2010 at Florida International University. Arizona State University expanded on the subject with a lecture by Charles Anderson, ASLA. Anderson stated that "ecology is concerned with the relationships between all organisms and the environment. Together and coupled with aesthetic and expressionist design principles, they form the foundation for urban design."

Mohsen Mostafavi, Gareth Doherty, Marina Correia, Ana Maria Duran Calisto, Giannina Braschi, and Luis Valenzuela produced a Latin American Ecological Urbanism project, resulting in the 2019 Spanish and Portuguese book Urbanismo ecológico en América Latina.

== Criticism ==
Ecological urbanism has been criticized as an idea that is loosely defined from a set of flashy projects. These are expensive schemes with a commercial and aesthetic purpose that satisfy a local or regional ambition to invest in ecology or sustainability without posing a more globally applicable approach. A true merger of landscape architecture with the field of Urban Ecology lacks. From this criticism Frederick Steiner introduced landscape ecological urbanism as an approach that can include the field of urban ecology. Wybe Kuitert has shown how such integrative planning and management of the city should rely on analysis. Discerning the potential quality of wild nature in the city is a first step to see how new urban ecology might be developed. Potential vegetation maps for a city are the tool to this end.

Ecological Urbanism is explained as a successor to Landscape Urbanism without the difference between the two approaches, and the terms used in the new approach, being defined. Jason King sees it as an inadequately explained addition to a list of 61 other 'Fill-in-the-blank Urbanisms'. Tom Turner welcomes landscape and ecological urbanism as 'the most significant contributions to landscape design theory since the landscape architecture profession was launched in the mid-nineteenth century' but is 'unpersuaded by the change of name'

== See also ==
- Urban vitality
