= SmartCode =

This is what is smart all the time, creation and invention of good things

SmartCode is a unified land development ordinance template for planning and urban design. Originally developed by Duany Plater-Zyberk & Company, this open source program is a model form-based unified land development ordinance designed to create walkable neighborhoods across the full spectrum of human settlement, from the most rural to the most urban, incorporating a transect of character and intensity within each. It folds zoning, subdivision regulations, urban design, and basic architectural standards into one compact document. Because the SmartCode enables community vision by coding specific outcomes that are desired in particular places, it is meant to be locally calibrated by professional planners, architects, and attorneys.

The SmartCode is not a building code. Building codes address life/safety issues such as fire and storm protection. Examples of building codes include the International Building Code (IBC), International Residential Code (IRC), and International Code Council (ICC) documents.

In the discussion of Smart Growth as an alternative to urban sprawl, one key aspect often overlooked is the currently prevailing system of community development codes and standards that by design, whether intentionally or not, have promoted subdivisions and strip malls. To change these community settlement patterns to allow for land conservation and to promote traditional patterns of hamlet, village, town and city, new codes are necessary. The most comprehensive example of a code designed for this purpose is the SmartCode as described below.

== Technical description ==
Model Code – The SmartCode is a model code, with metrics designed to create a generic medium-sized American city structured into walkable neighborhoods. The model code is freeware, a template meant to be locally customized by professional planners, architects, and attorneys.

Form-Based – The SmartCode is a form-based code. Conventional Euclidean zoning regulates land development with the most emphasis on controlling land use. Form-based zoning has been developed over the last twenty years to overcome the problems of sprawl created by use-based codes. Form-based zoning regulates land development with the most emphasis on controlling urban form and less emphasis on controlling land uses (although uses with negative impacts, such as heavy industry, adult businesses, etc. are still regulated). Urban form features regulated under the SmartCode include the width of lots, size of blocks, building setbacks, building heights, placement of buildings on the lot, location of parking, etc.

Unified Land Development Regulation – The SmartCode is a unified land development code that can include zoning, subdivision regulations, urban design, signage, landscaping, and basic architectural standards.

Walkable Neighborhoods – One of the basic principles in the SmartCode is that towns and cities should be structured as a series of walkable neighborhoods. Walkable neighborhoods require a mix of land uses (residential, office, and retail), public spaces with a sense of enclosure to create “outdoor rooms”, and pedestrian-oriented transportation design.

Rural-Urban Transect – The zones within the SmartCode are designed to create complete human habitats ranging from the very rural to the very urban. Where conventional zoning categories are based on different land uses, SmartCode zoning categories are based on their rural-urban character. All categories within the SmartCode allow some mix of uses. SmartCode zoning categories ensure that a community offers a full diversity of building types, thoroughfare types, and civic space types, and that each has appropriate characteristics for its location.

Though version 9.0 is only 50 pages, the SmartCode may replace conventional zoning, subdivision, and design regulations, making walkable mixed-use development legal by right.

The first city to adopt a SmartCode as a mandatory overlay for its downtown was Petaluma, California, in June 2003. The City of Miami adopted an exclusive citywide SmartCode in October 2009 and implemented it in May 2010. It is known as Miami21. It was calibrated by Duany Plater-Zyberk & Company. Cities that have adopted SmartCodes as a parallel option to their conventional zoning include Gulfport, Mississippi, Pass Christian, Mississippi, and Montgomery, Alabama. In addition, scores of private traditional neighborhood developments (TND) have been permitted under transect-based codes that are essentially the same as Article 5 of the SmartCode.

The SmartCode also includes additional supplementary “modules” with specialized techniques. The SmartCode Sustainability Module was introduced by Jaime Correa from Jaime Correa and Associates, in the City of Miami; the SmartCode Light Imprint and Drainage Module was designed by Tom Low at the Charlotte office of Duany and Plater-Zyberk; the Environmental Standards Module has been produced by Doug Farr, in Chicago. Other Modules include: Natural Drainage Standards, architecture/lighting/sound and visibility and Hazard Mitigation Standards.
