= Green track =

Railway trackbed planted with grass or other vegetation

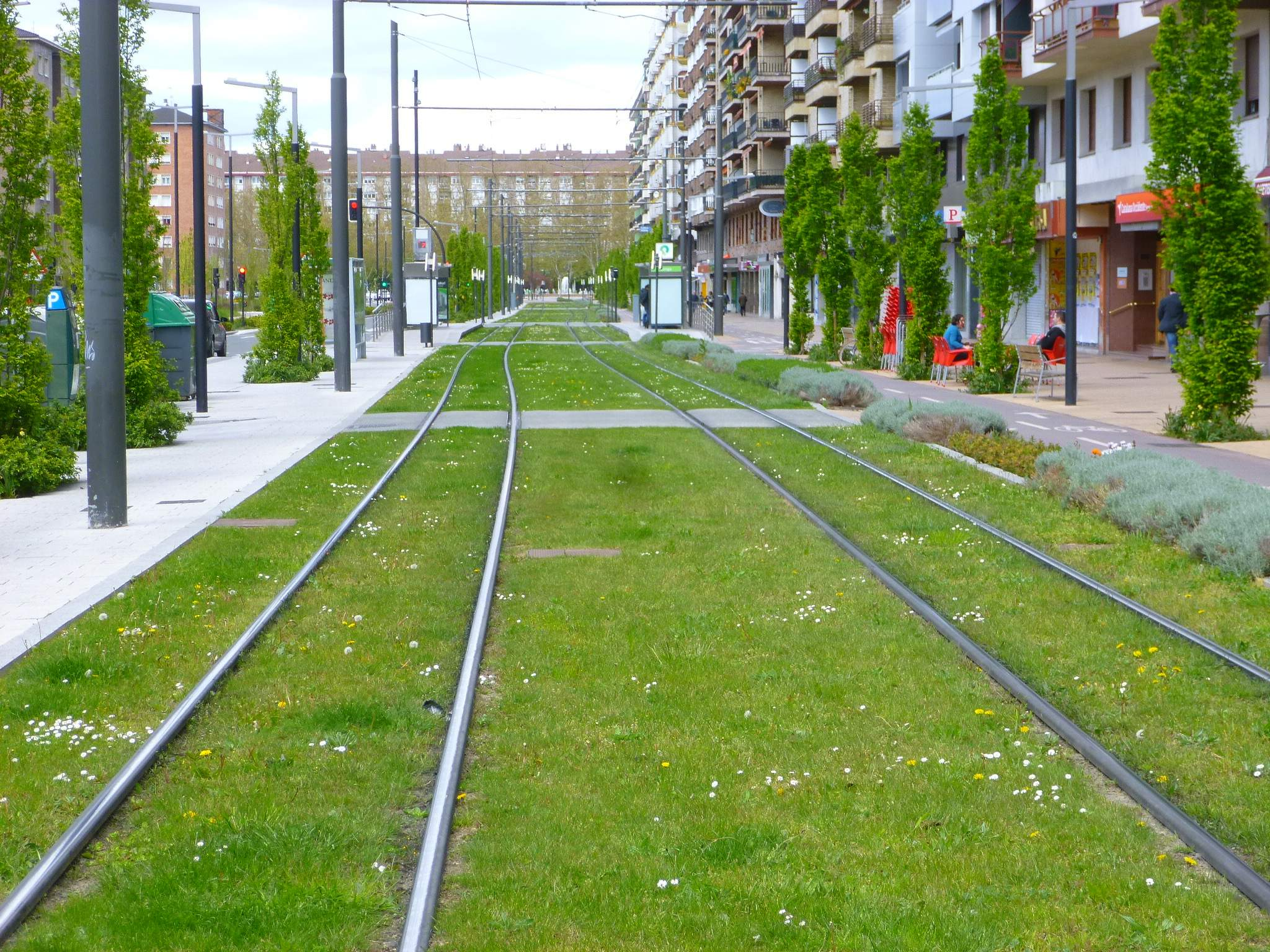
Green track in Vitoria-Gasteiz, Basque Country, Spain

Green track (also grassed track or lawn track) is a type of railway track in which the track bed and surrounding area are planted with grass turf or other vegetation as ground cover. It is a popular way of making railways more visually appealing, particularly for trams and light rail, and providing additional urban green space. Aside from the visual improvement, the vegetation provides a number of positive effects, such as noise reduction, less air pollution, rainwater runoff mitigation, and reduced urban heat island effect.

== History ==
The first green tracks were installed in 1905 along Hardenbergstraße in Berlin. Due to the technical challenges they posed, many green tracks were phased out in the following decades, but beginning in the mid-1980s, green tracks have seen a resurgence.

== Impact ==
Green tracks have several positive impacts on the urban environment. They reduce surface runoff by retaining an estimated 50-70% of precipitation, while the remaining stormwater is released more slowly and with fewer pollutants. The absorbed water is released through evapotranspiration and provides a cooling effect on the surrounding urban micro-climate. Vegetation, commonly grass or sedum, provides an important surface for the deposit and capture of fine particulate matter. High-vegetation tracks offer sound reduction under ideal conditions of up to 3 decibels, and are subjectively perceived as quieter.

A light rail project in Sydney, Australia, identified green track as requiring 81% less concrete compared to embedded track.

The cooling effect of the green surfaces, particularly in summer, lowers the temperature of the rails themselves, reducing the risk of buckling. The city of Dresden estimates that their total installed capacity of green track has a cooling effect, reducing the temperature by 10 °C (18 °F) for 8.8 cubic kilometres (2.1 cubic miles) of air per year.

Green tracks, particularly those planted with endemic plant species, positively impact local biodiversity by providing food sources for wild bees and habitats for insects.

== Types ==
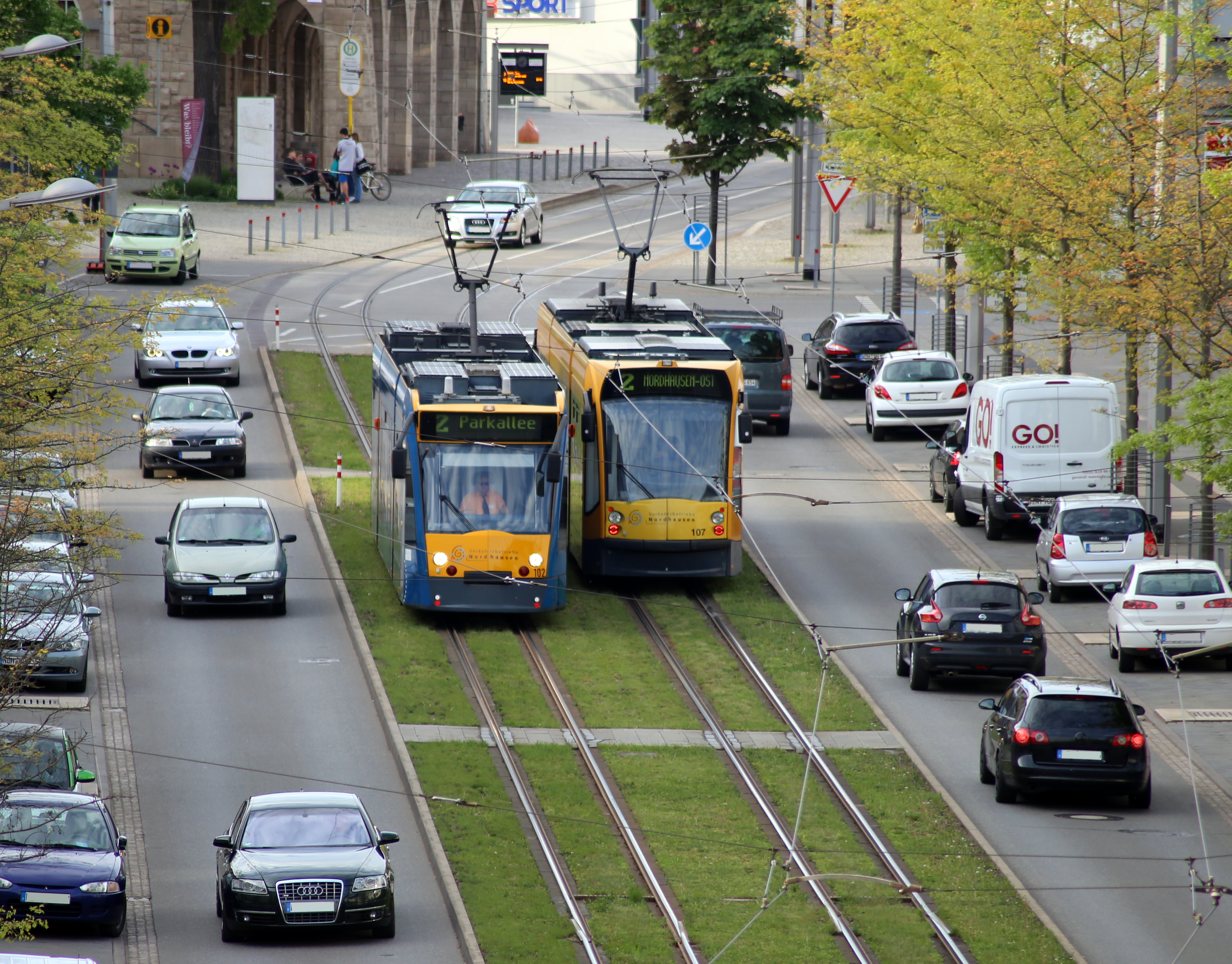
High-vegetation tracks with cavity filler blocks, Nordhausen.

There are several different designs for green tracks:

- Track with high vegetation, or top-of-rail (TOR): Grooved rails are placed on concrete sleepers, and the surrounding space is filled with dirt up to the grade of the top of the tracks. This technique provides the best noise abatement and a visually uniform green area, as only the track surfaces are visible. The sides of the tracks are generally protected with cavity filler blocks to prevent direct contact between the rails and the soil, keeping the fasteners clean and preventing or slowing corrosion. The soil must be removed during track renewal operations. Soil moisture leads to corrosion in the track and fasteners, and both must typically be replaced during renewal. Because the fasteners are below the surface, they are more difficult to inspect. The railway area is more difficult to identify as hazardous, and additional protection is needed against stray currents. Track with high vegetation can also be crossed or driven on in exceptional circumstances.

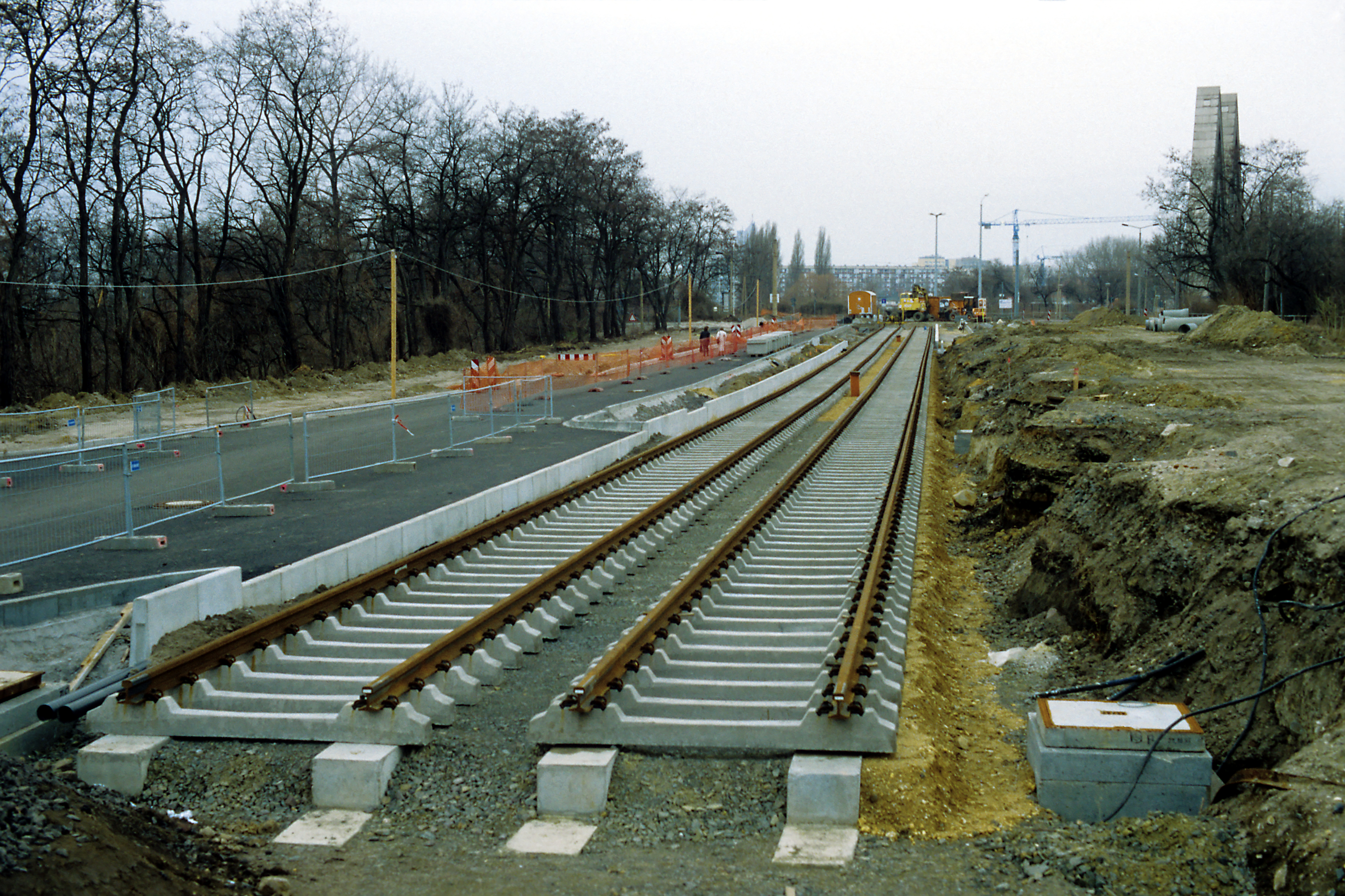
Low vegetation tracks during construction. The longitudinal concrete beams provide support that otherwise would have come from track ballast.

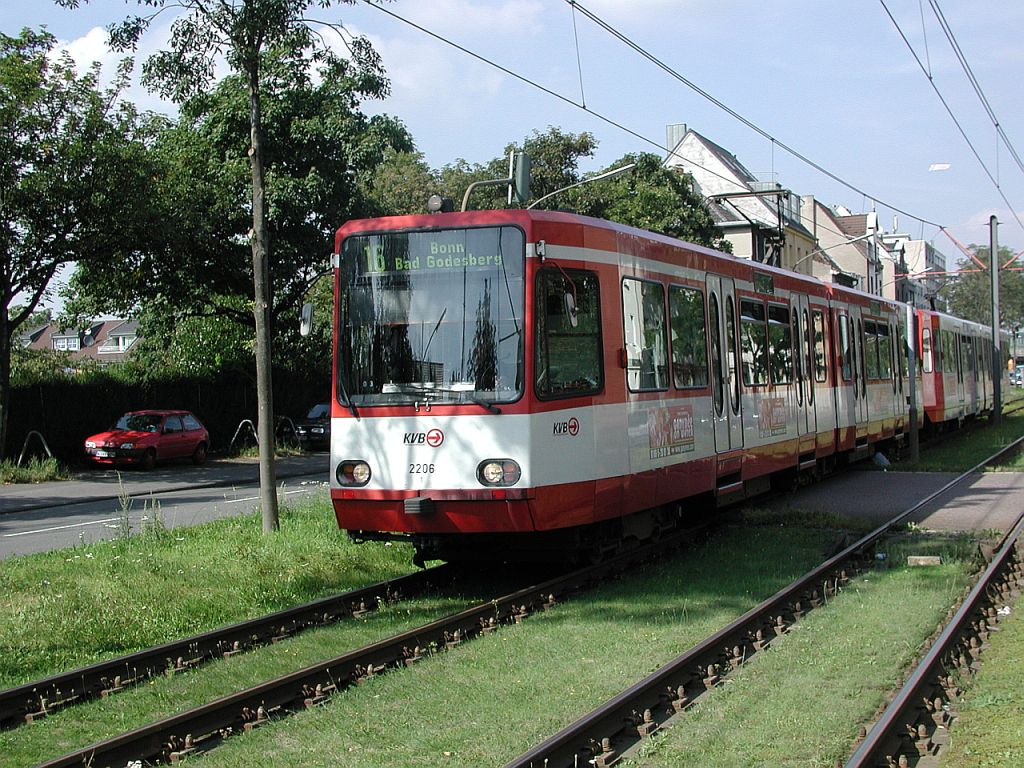
Low-vegetation tracks with flat-bottomed rails, used by the Cologne Stadtbahn.

- Track with low vegetation or foot-of-rail (FOR): Concrete sleepers are placed upon longitudinal concrete beams, and the space in between the sleepers is filled with topsoil instead of track ballast, with vegetation only reaching the base of the tracks. This has a reduced sound-dampening effect, and the uniform green area is visually interrupted. However, inspection and maintenance of the rails are easier, and the fasteners corrode much more slowly because they are not constantly exposed to moisture from the soil. Switches and sensors can be mounted on the tracks, and there is better control over residual electrical current flowing into the ground. This design also allows for normal flat-bottomed rails, which are typically cheaper and easier to maintain than grooved tramway track.
- Track with mixed-level vegetation: This solution incorporates low vegetation between the rails and high vegetation outside. This allows for easier inspection of the rails, but creates a visible trough in the green surface area, where dead leaves and debris can collect.

The ground cover requires a stable track bed construction in which the track geometry will not shift after construction. This is commonly accomplished with ballastless track. The addition of soil to track ballast would reduce the friction between the individual ballast stones and make it easier for the track to shift out of place, while making adjustments and corrections more difficult. At the same time, extensions and changes are more involved than with conventional track ballast.

The soil surrounding the tracks is planted with grass or other suitable ground cover plants. In comparison, grass tends to require higher maintenance, such as mowing and irrigation, and a soil layer of at least 15 centimetres (6 in). In particular, shade- and drought-tolerant species are chosen depending on local conditions; sedum is a common choice, as it requires a substrate of only 4–8 centimetres (1 1/2–3 inches). The space between the tracks can also be filled with grass pavers instead of soil. The city of Braunschweig, Germany, together with the Julius Kühn-Institut, developed a mixture of endemic grasses and wildflowers suitable for green tracks that will also provide a habitat for wild bees.

== Prevalence ==
Green tracks are particularly common in Central Europe; in 2015, Germany had a total of 565 km (351 mi) of green track. In France, the government prescribes the use of green track wherever practicable for tramway construction.

== Gallery ==
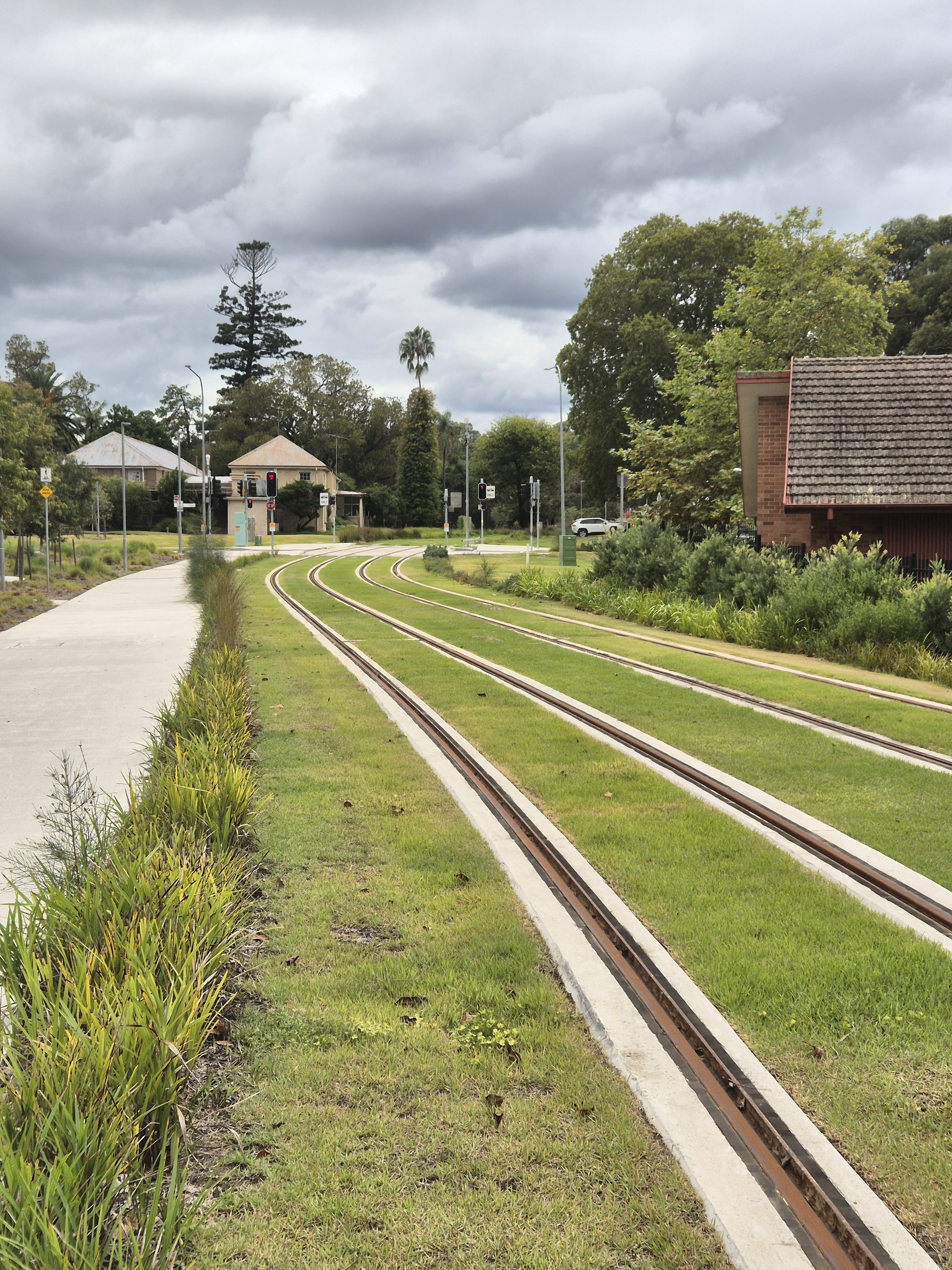
Parramatta Light Rail green track, Sydney, Australia

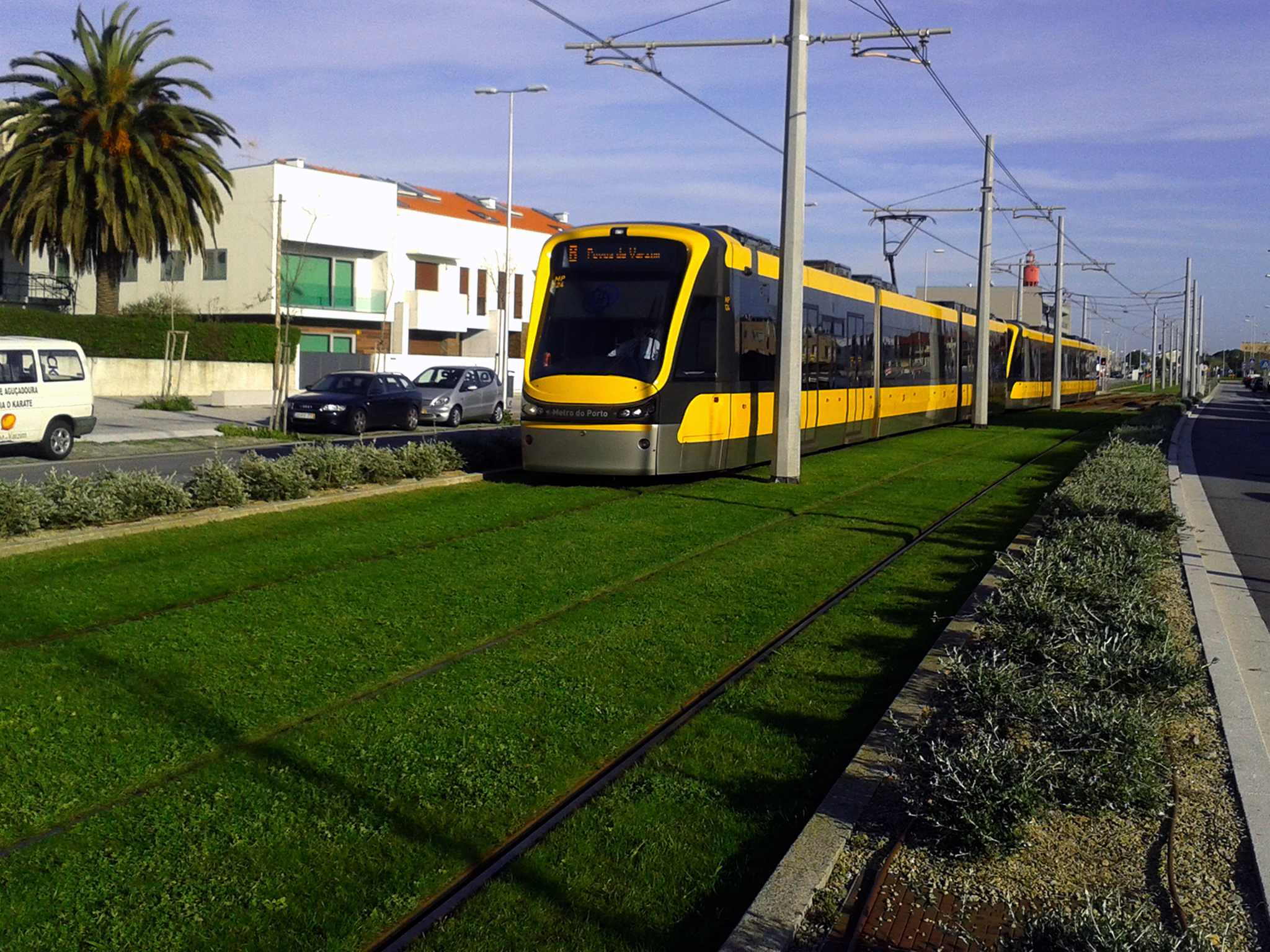
Porto Metro outside the city center

An Alstom Citadis 302 in Dijon, France

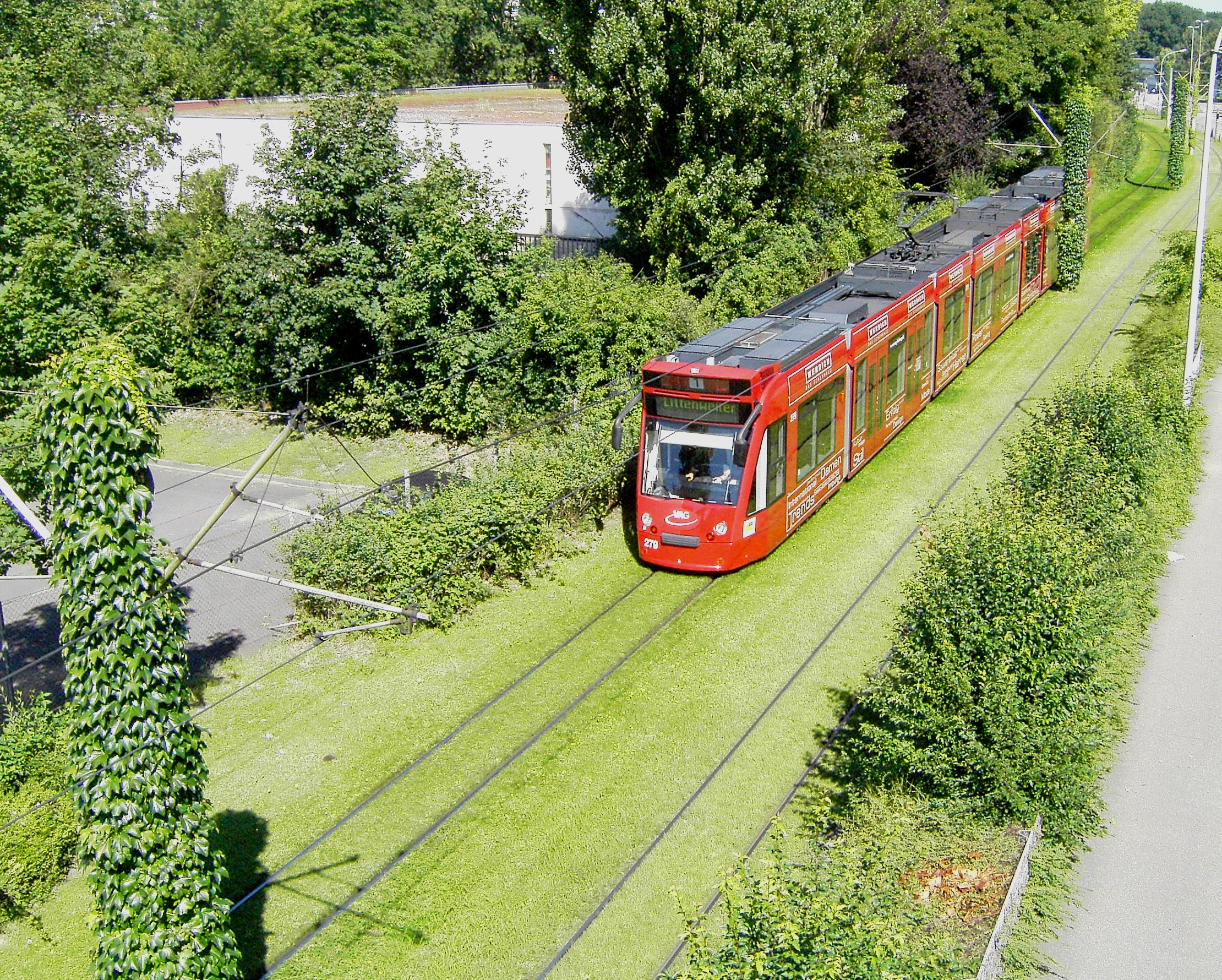
High-vegetation tram tracks in Freiburg, Germany

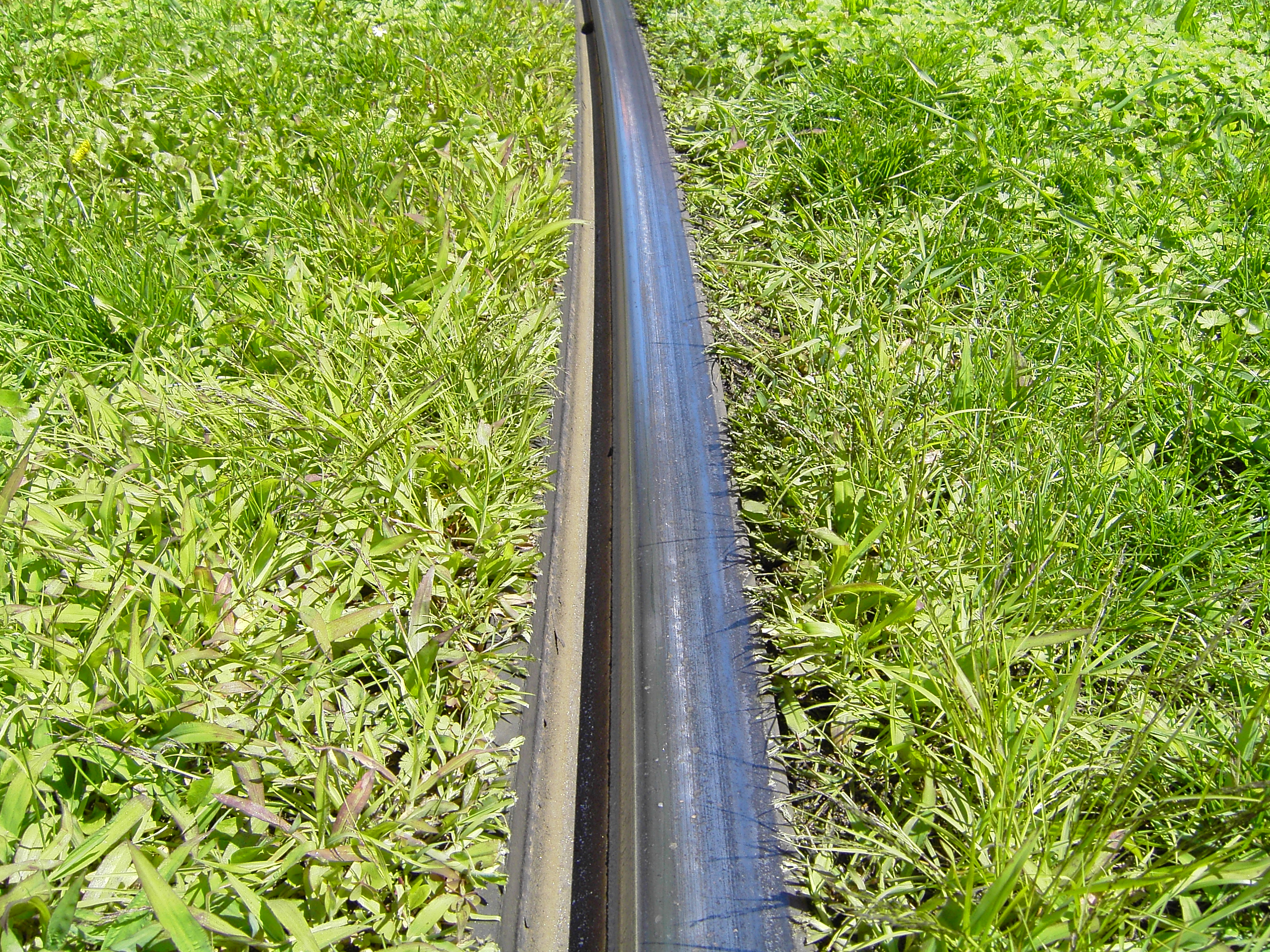
Grooved tram tracks in grass

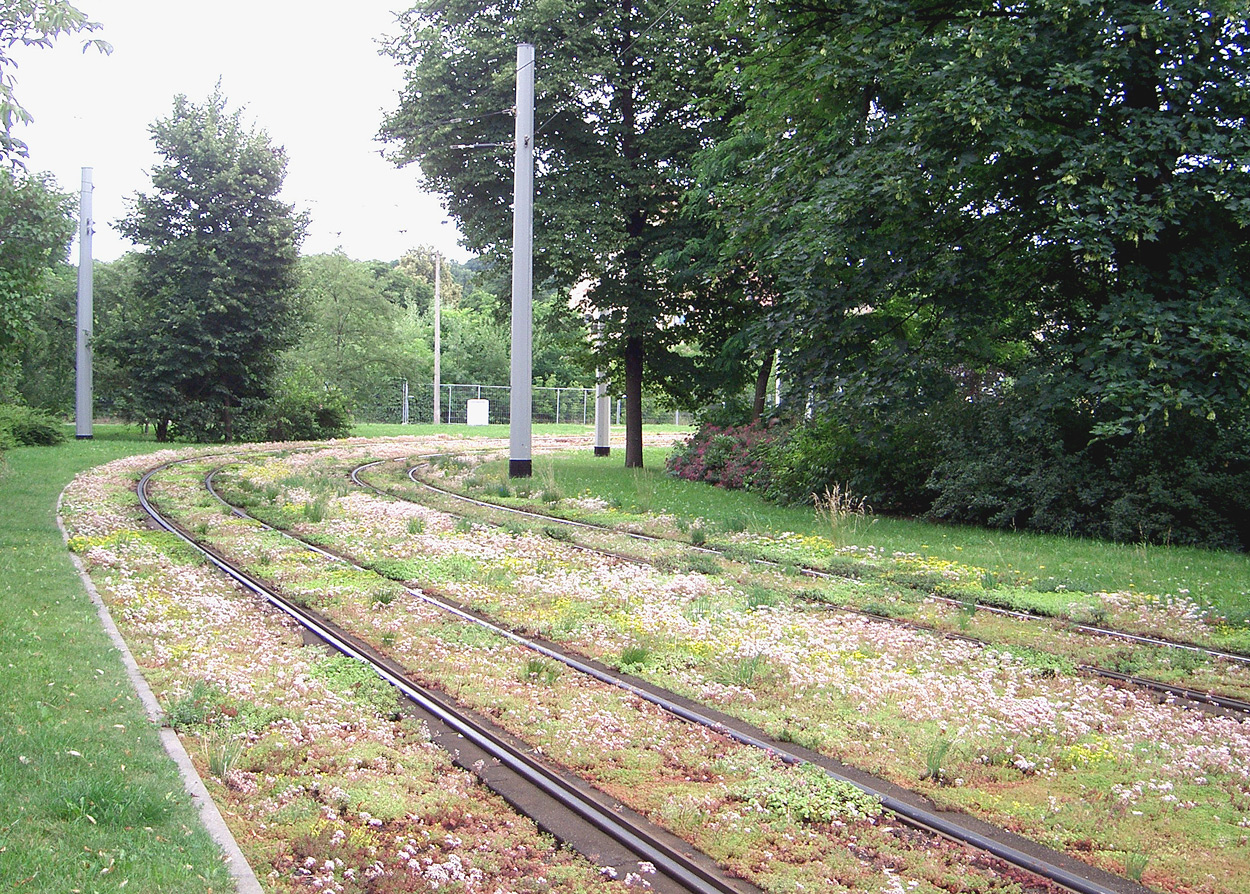
Sedum used as ground cover in Zwickau, Germany

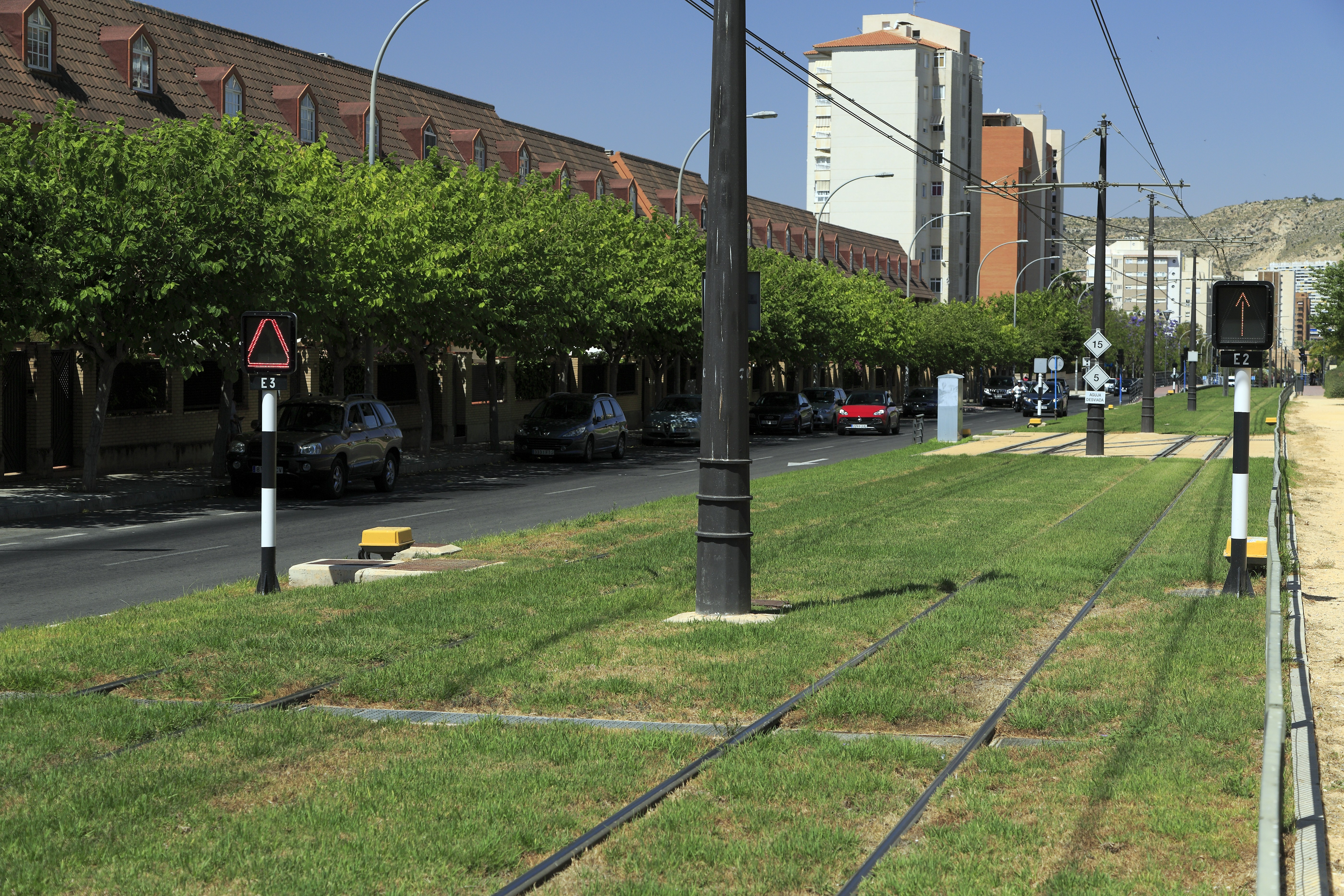
The Alicante Tram, combining high-vegetation with flat-bottomed rails.

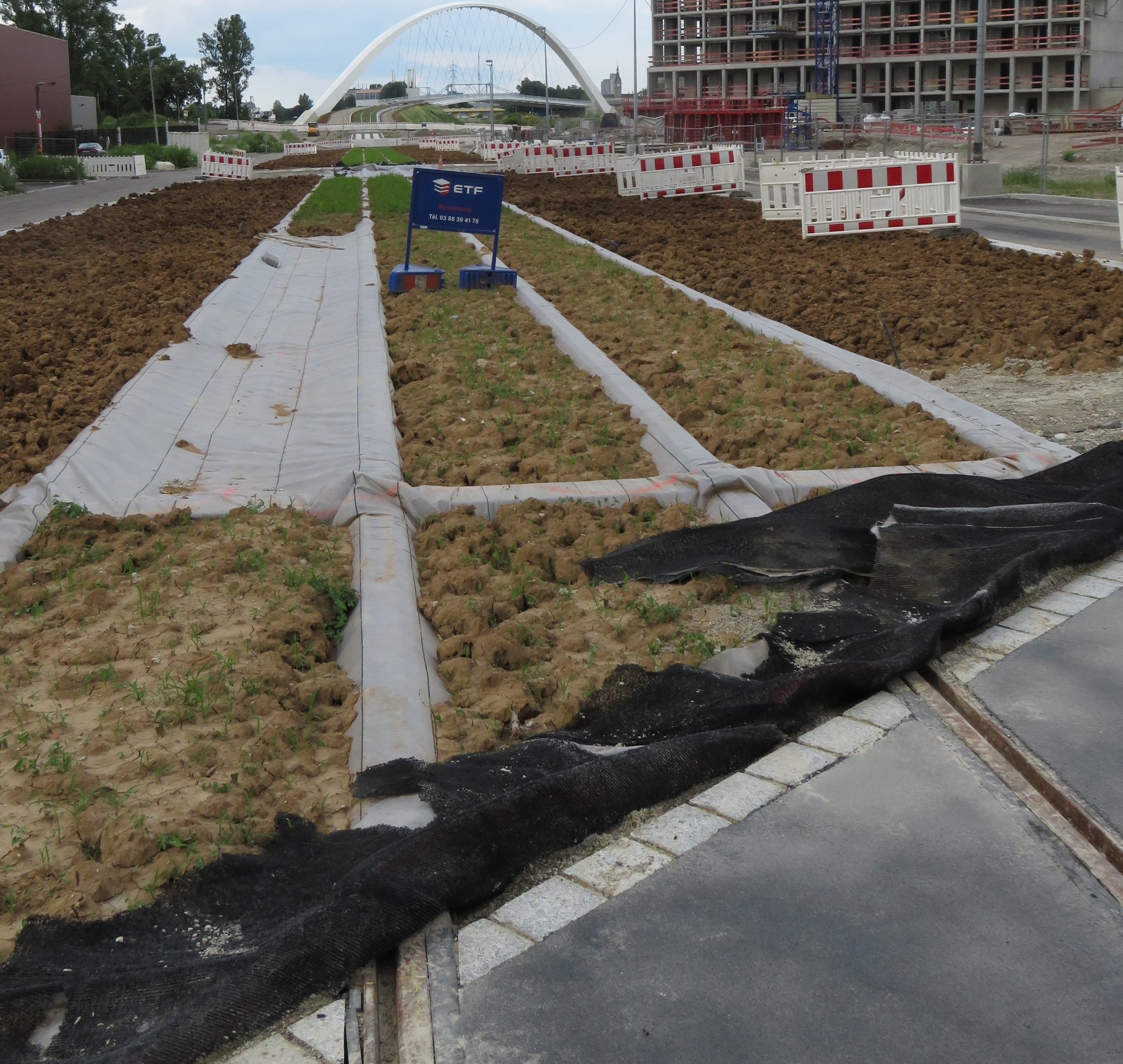
The rails are covered while the track bed is being filled (Strasbourg tramway)

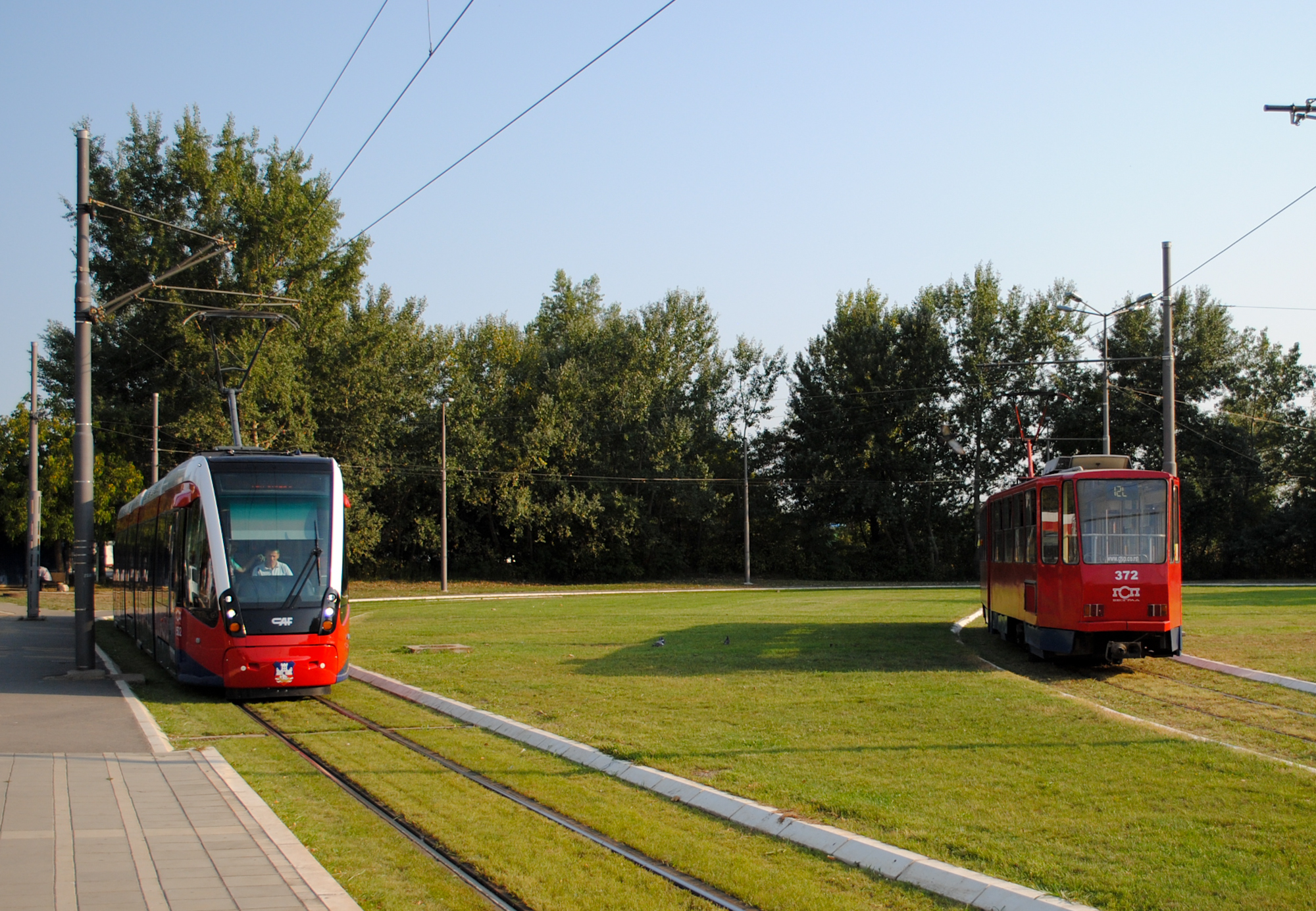
Trams in Belgrade

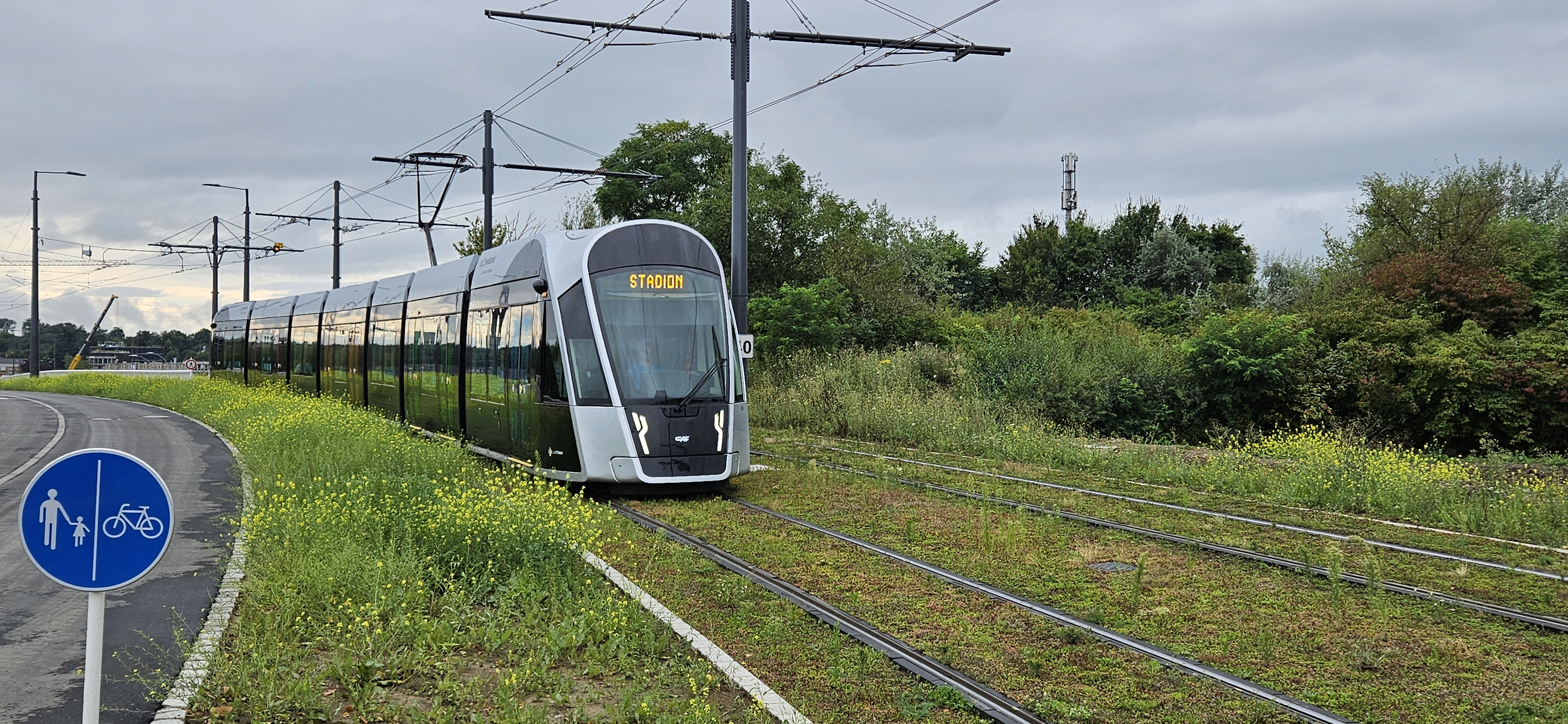
A green track tramline in Luxembourg

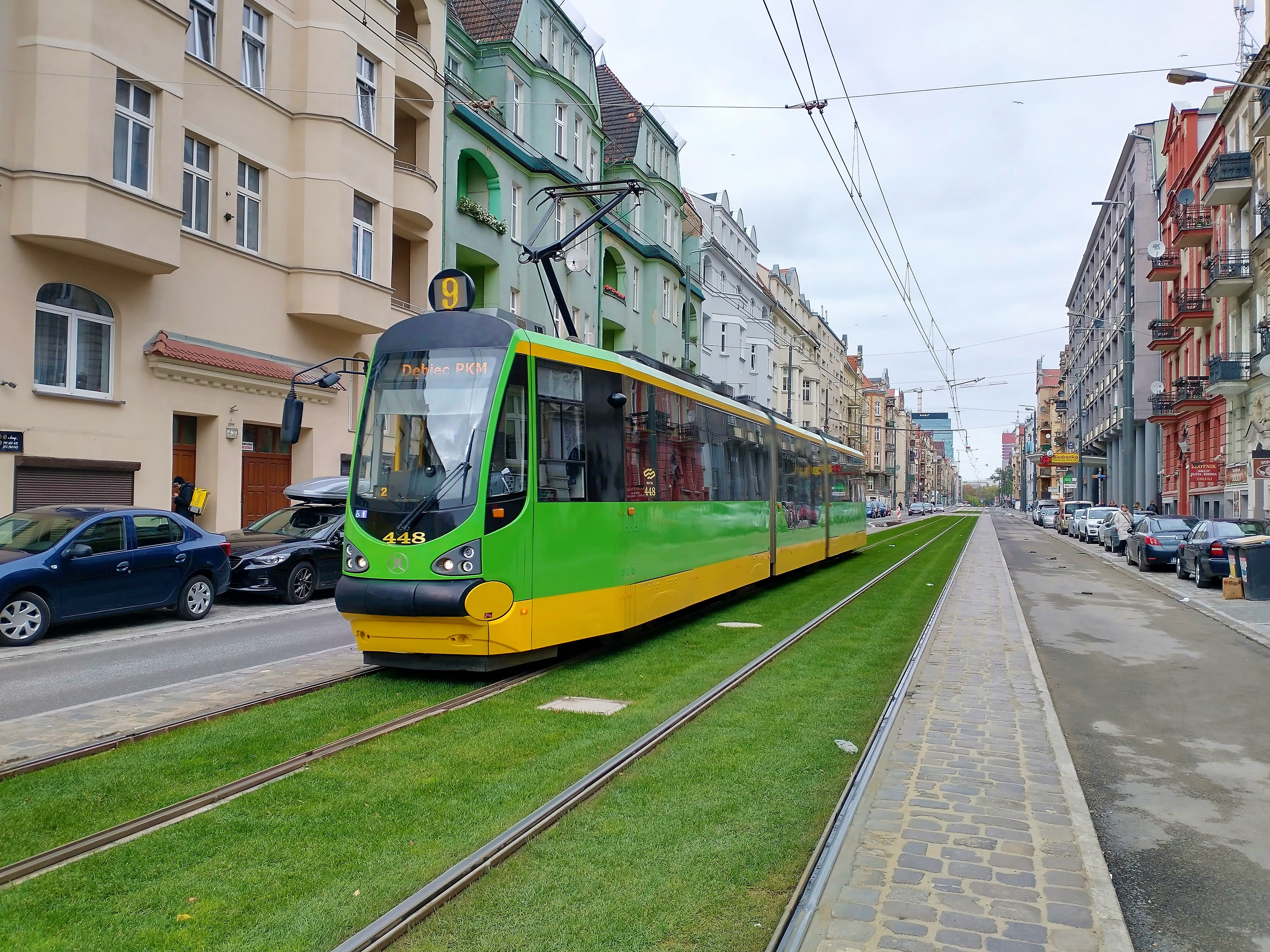
Green track tramline with Moderus Beta tram in Poznań, Poland

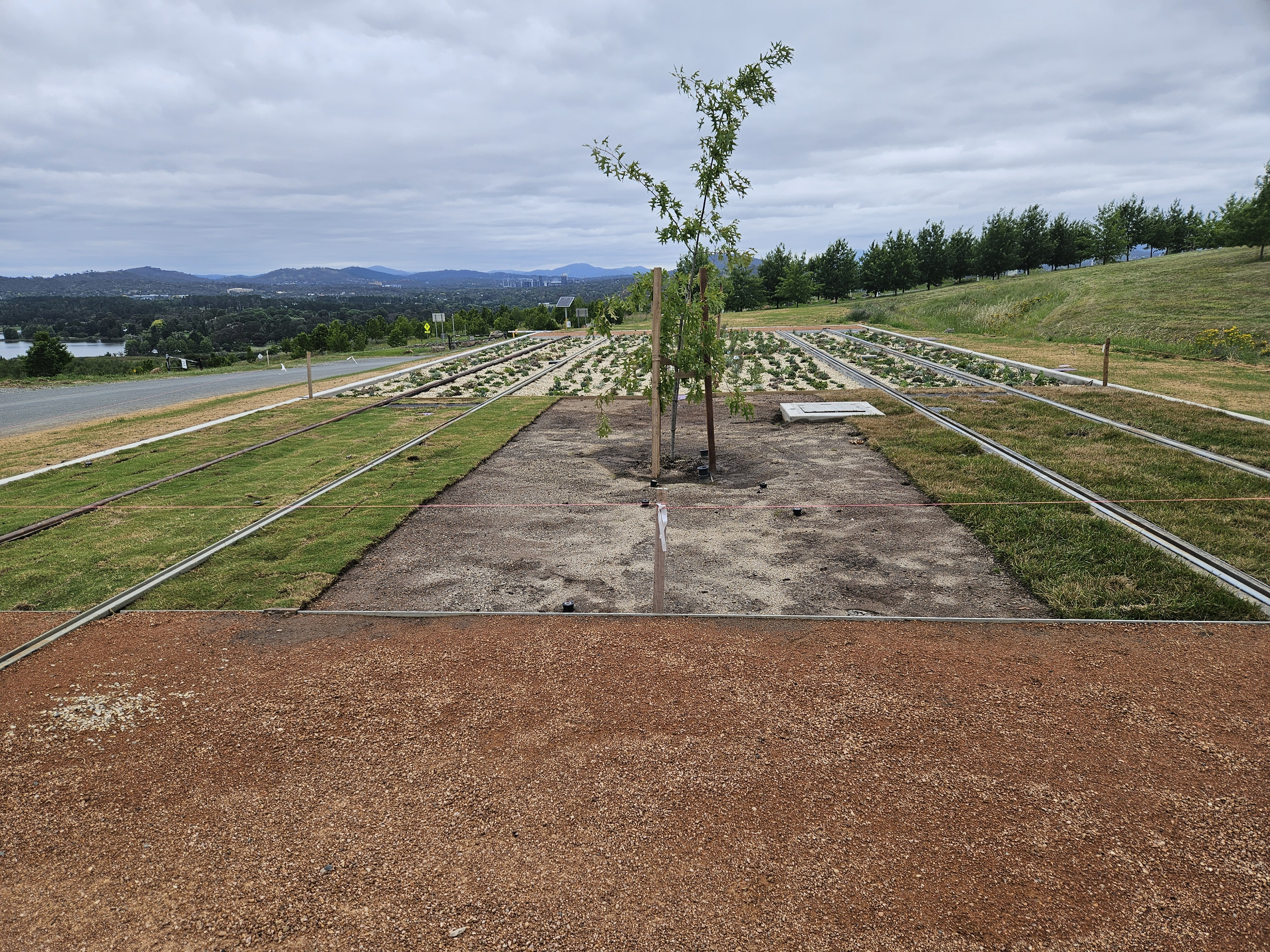
Two different types of green tracks being trialled in Canberra ahead of being installed in the city's light rail system

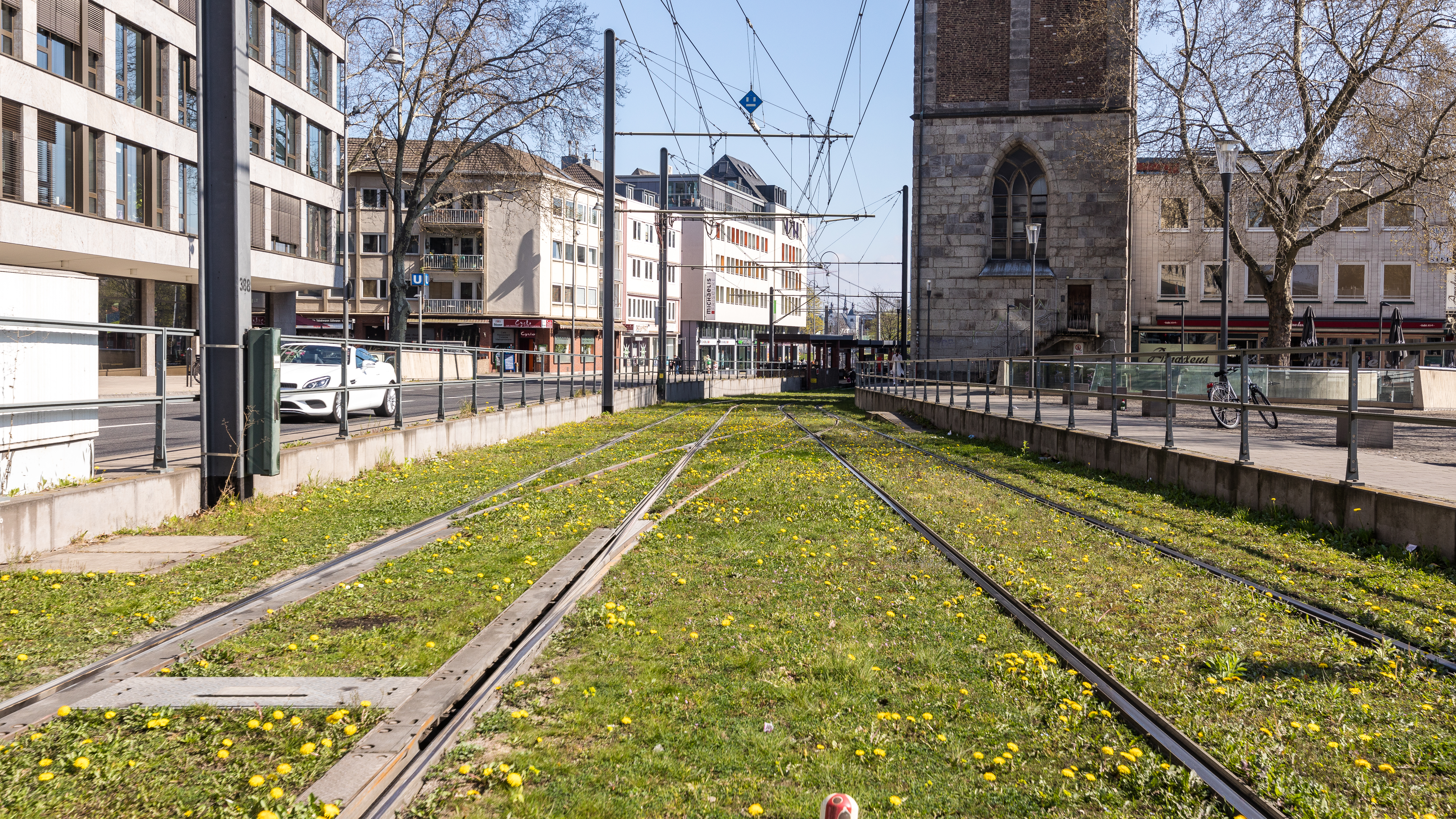
Green tracks with a raised bed, in the Cologne Stadtbahn network

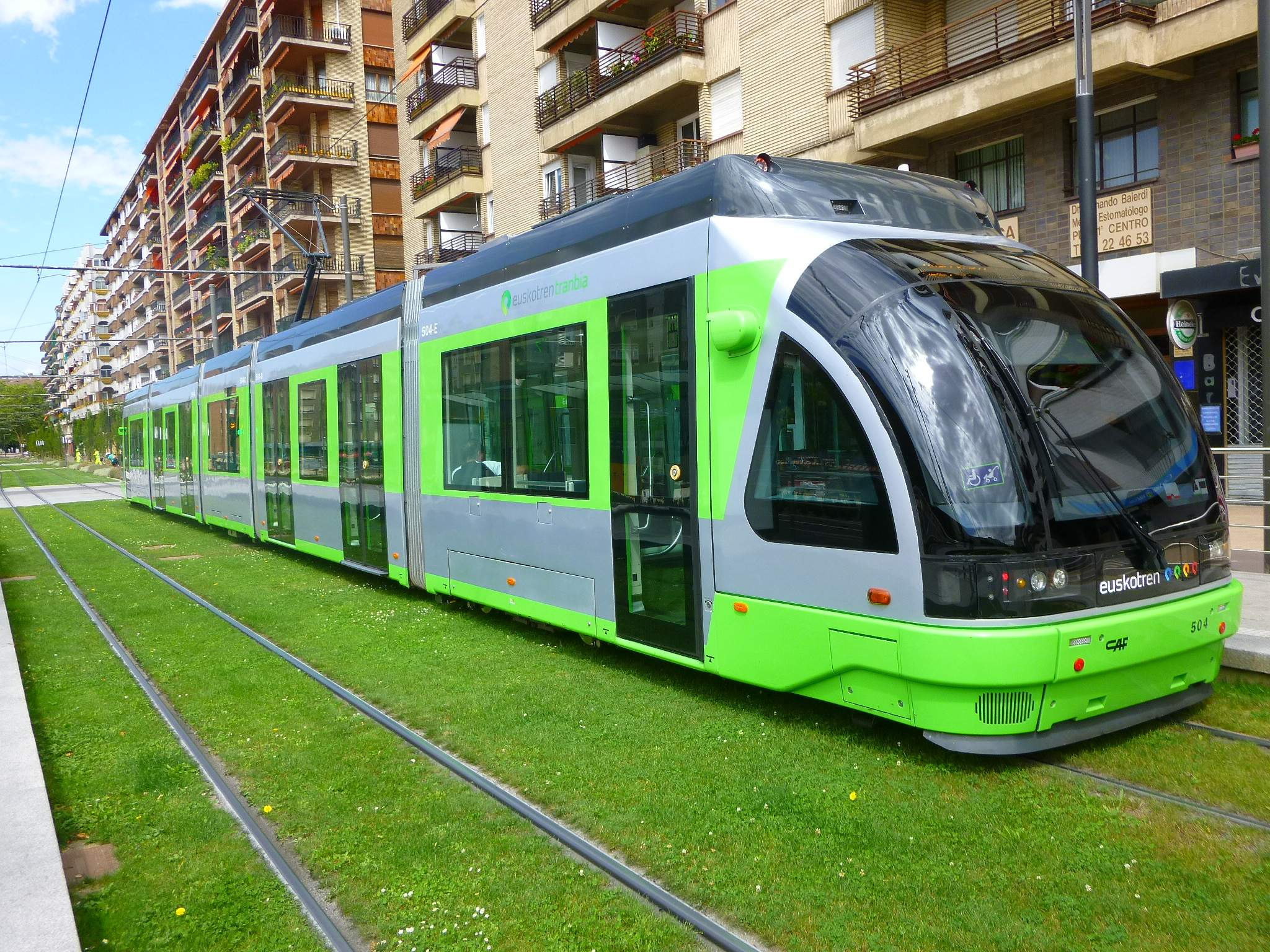
Green track in Vitoria-Gasteiz, Basque Country, Spain

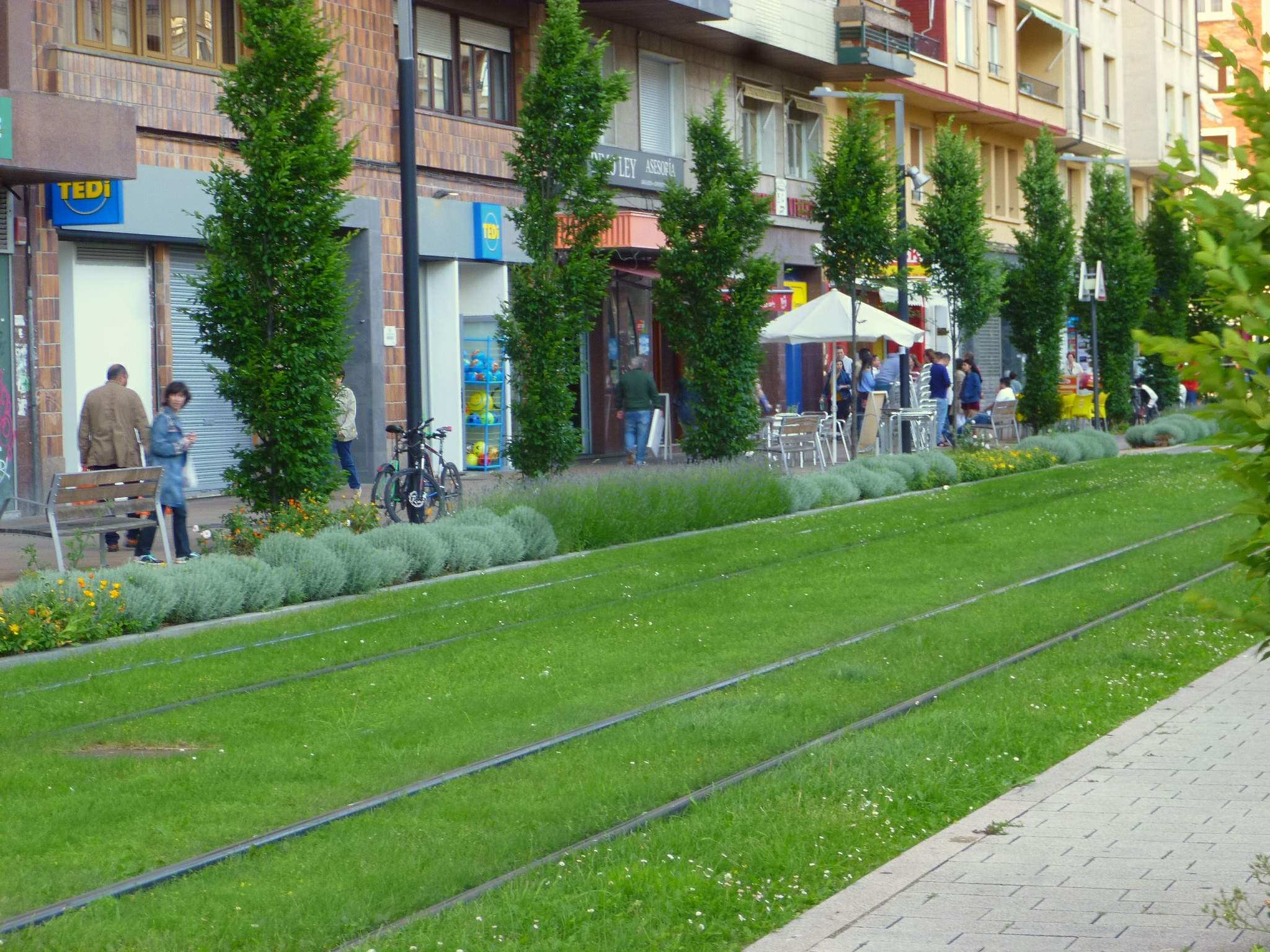
Green track in Vitoria-Gasteiz, Basque Country, Spain

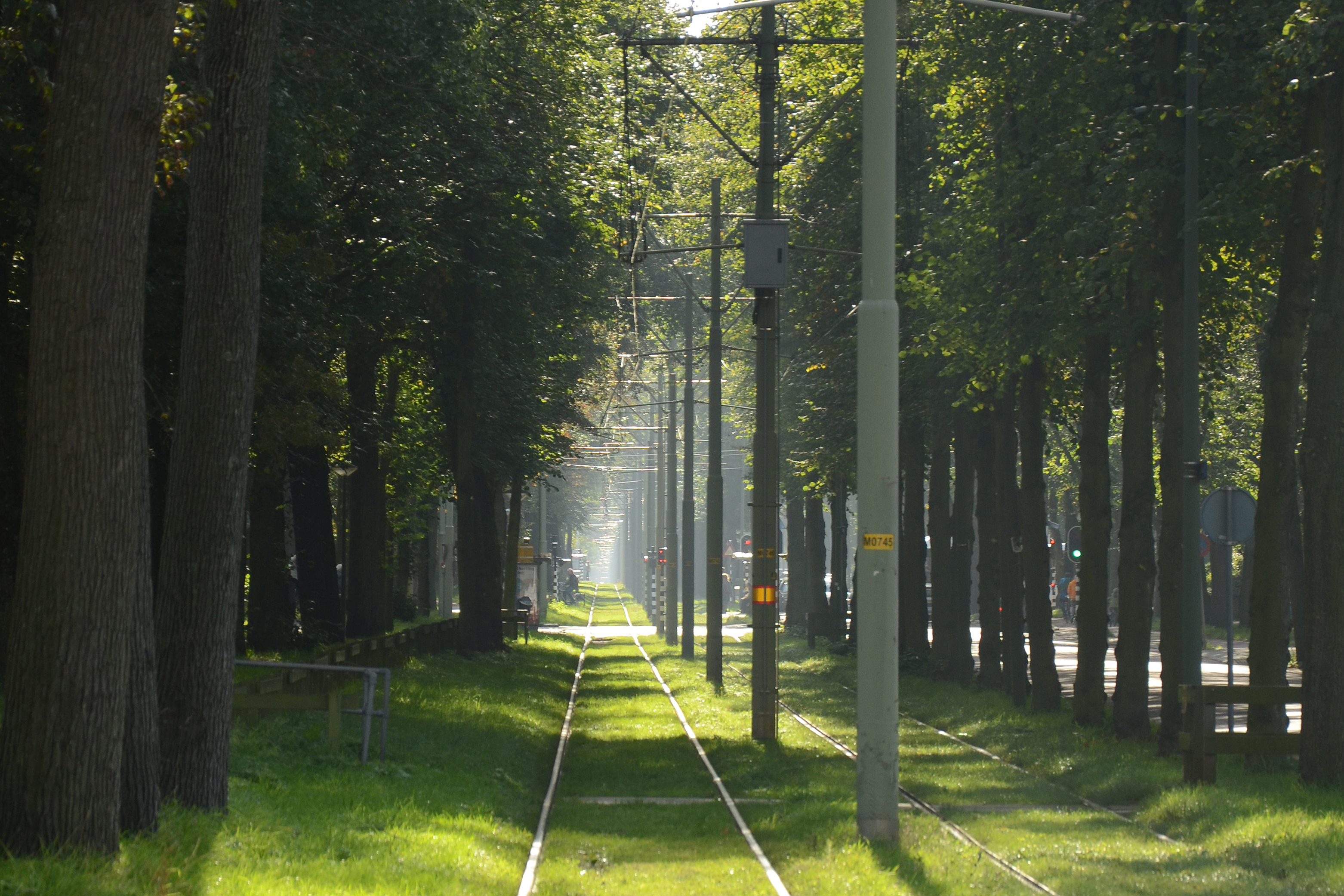
Green track in Scheveningseweg, The Hague, Netherlands

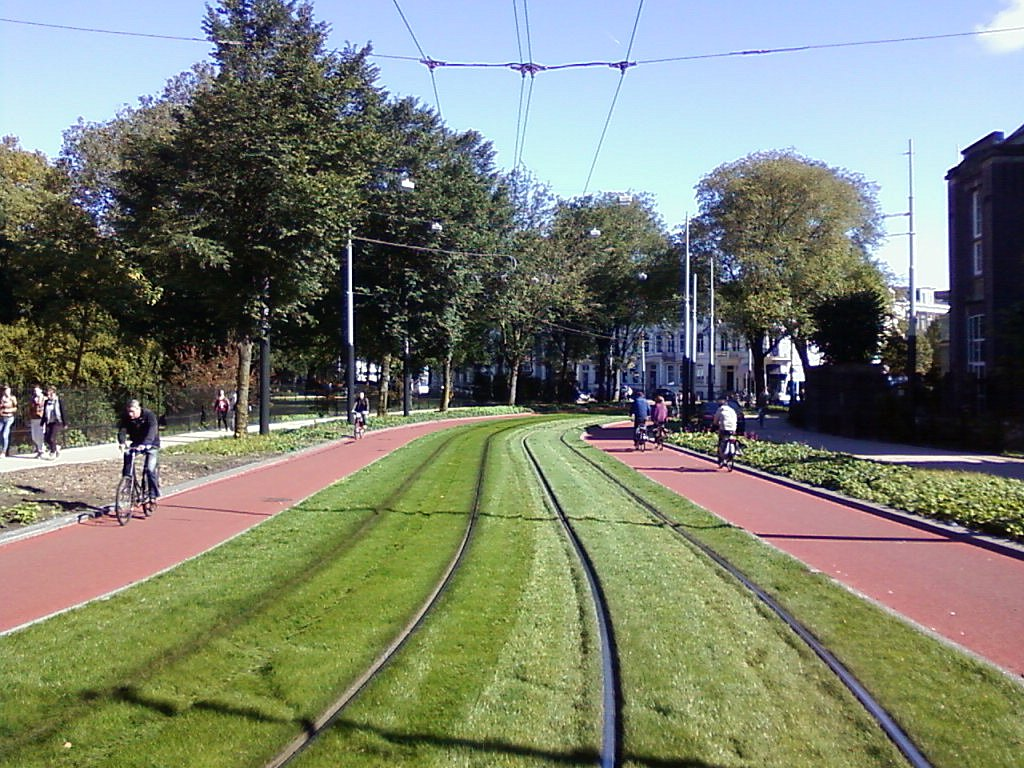
Green track in Amsterdam, Netherlands

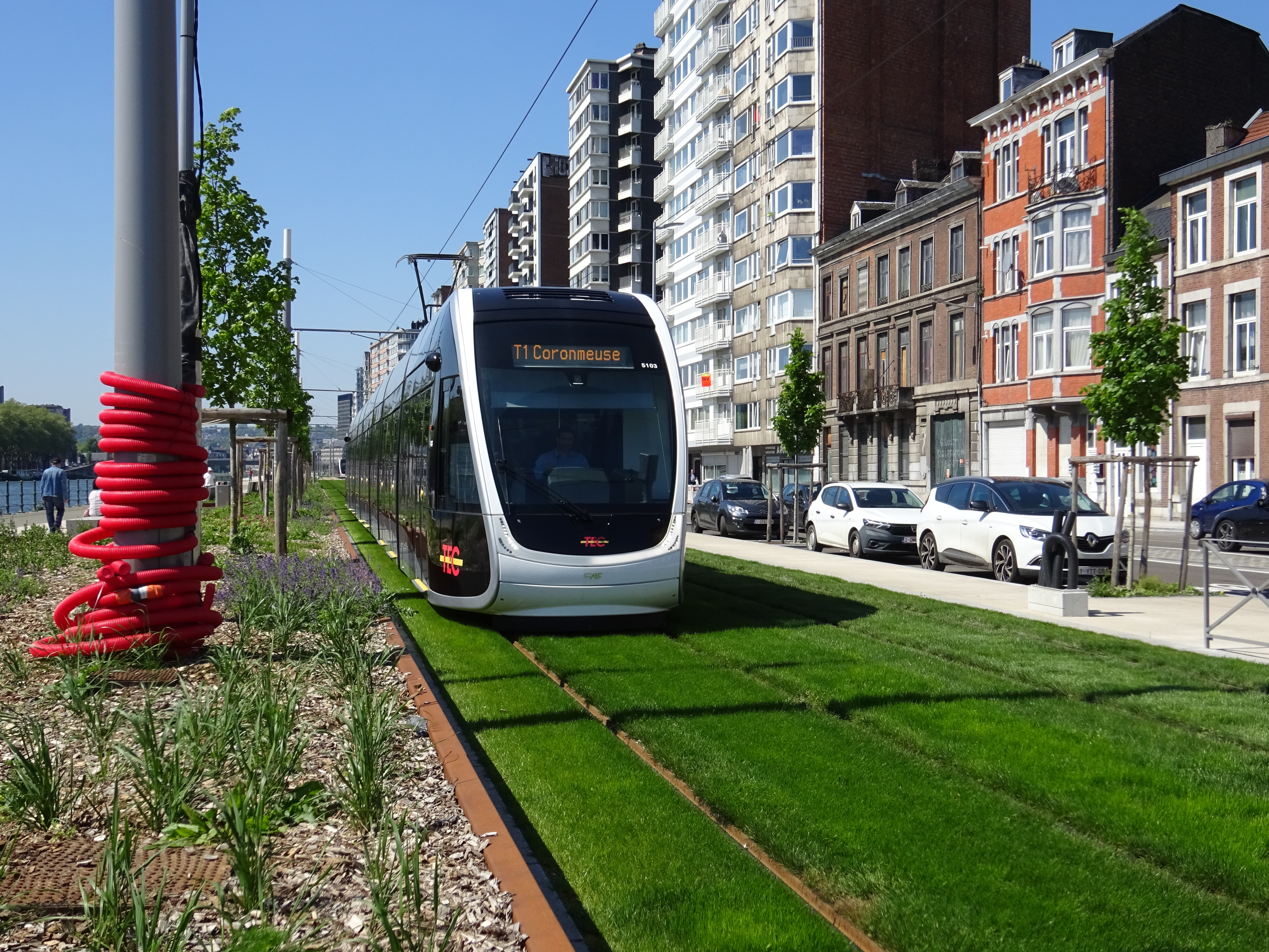
Grass track in Liège, Belgium

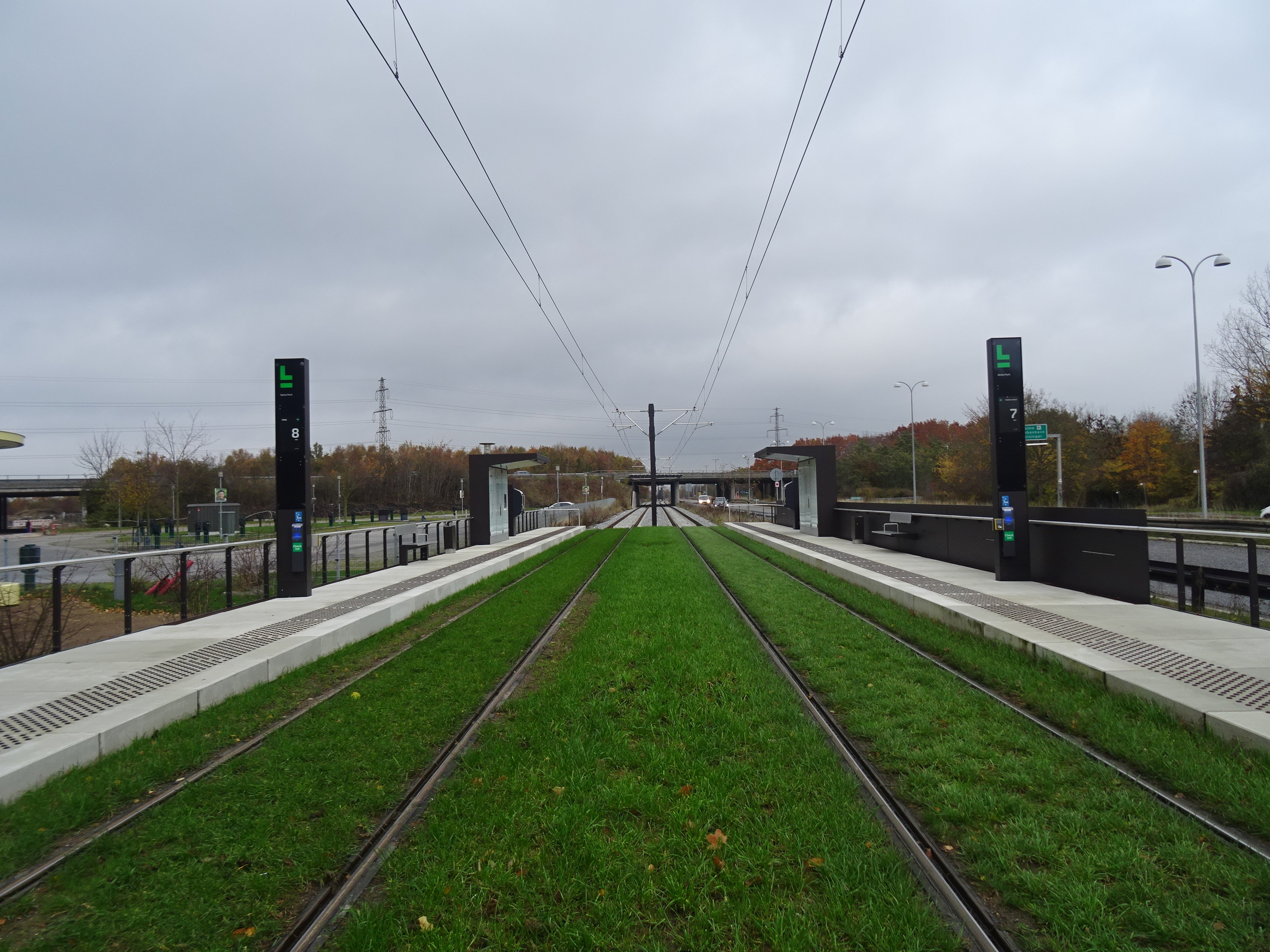
Grass track in Copenhagen, Denmark

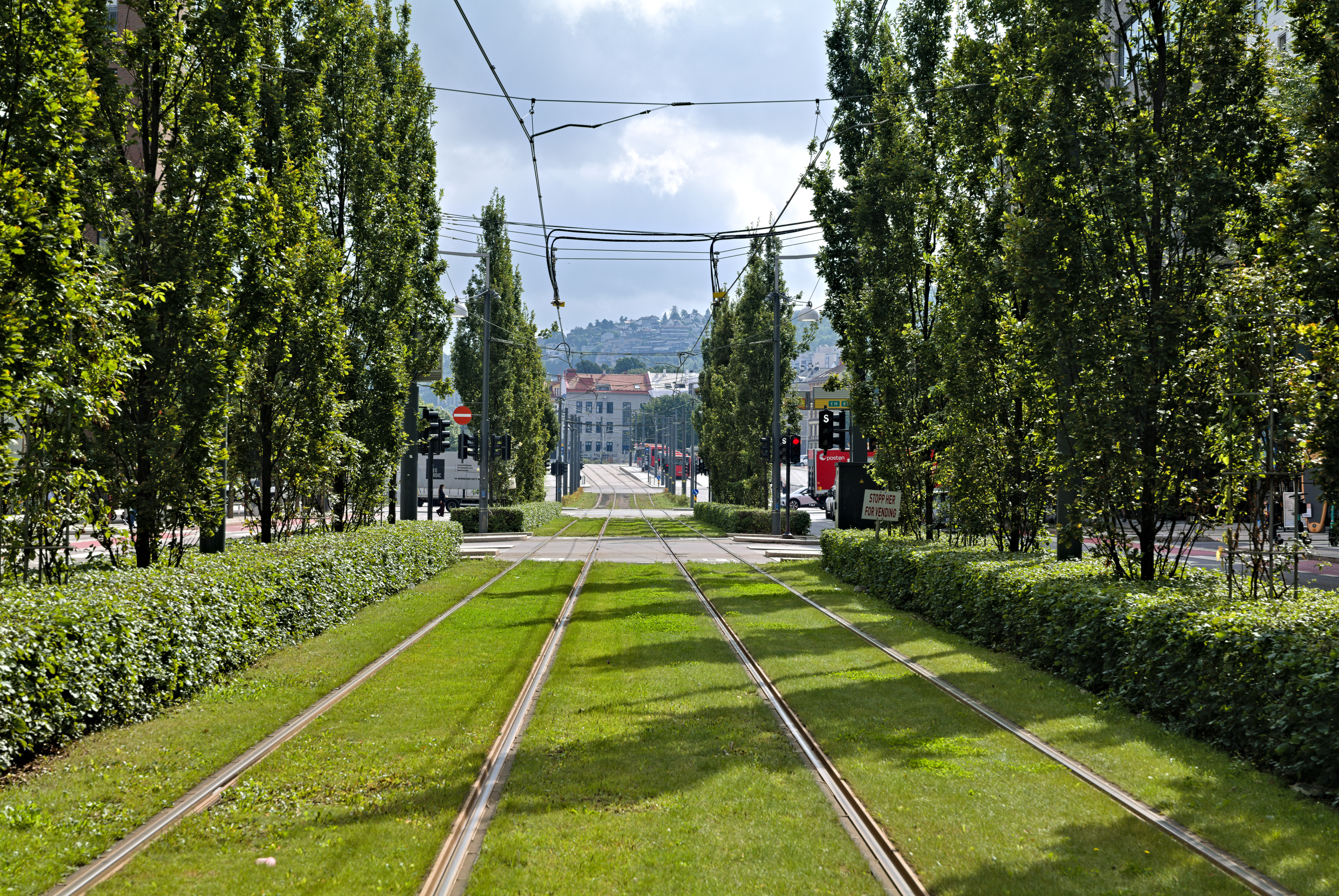
Grass track in Oslo, Norway

== See also ==
- Conservation development
- Environmental design
- Environmental planning
- Green infrastructure
- Sustainable urbanism
- Urban green space
- Urban nature
- Water-sensitive urban design
