= Doug Farr =

American architect and urban planner

Douglas Lynn Farr is an American architect and urban planner. Farr was born in Detroit, Michigan and received his undergraduate degree in architecture from the University of Michigan in Ann Arbor and his master's from Columbia Graduate School of Architecture, Planning and Preservation.

In 1991, Farr founded Farr Associates Architecture and Urban Design, Inc., a sustainable architectural and planning firm in Chicago, Illinois.

Farr is Vice Chair of the board for the Congress for the New Urbanism, a member of the LEED Steering Committee and was the inaugural chair of the LEED for Neighborhood Development committee. He is the founder of the 2030 Communities Campaign that seeks to reduce vehicle miles traveled. In 2007 he authored Sustainable Urbanism: Urban Design With Nature.
