= Jaime Correa (architect) =

American architect

Jaime Correa (born September 19, 1957, in Colombia) is an urban planner, architect, and professor at the University of Miami.

Correa is an authority in architecture, urban design, and sustainable development. He is the founding principal of Jaime Correa and Associates, the Miami-based design firm, and a former founding partner of several other New Urbanism firms in Florida.

He is one of the 14 architects and urban planners who instituted the New Urbanism movement in the United States and one of its representatives and critics in Latin America.

He held the Knight Professorship in Community Building at the University of Miami for seven consecutive years. Since 2021, he has served as director of the University of Miami's undergraduate program and was responsible for teaching and coordinating the Master in Urban Design and the graduate program in Suburb and Town Design at the School of Architecture, where he is currently an associate professor in Practice.

== Early life and education ==
Correa holds a master's degree in City Planning with emphasis in Historic Preservation and a master's degree in Architecture with a certificate in Urban Design from the University of Pennsylvania in Philadelphia. He also received a certificate in Classical Architecture and Medieval Iconography from the University of Cambridge, in England with the sponsorship of The English Speaking Union of the United States. He received his bachelor's degree in architecture and urbanism from the Universidad Pontificia Bolivariana in Medellín, Colombia in 1981.

== Career ==
=== Publications ===
Correa is the author of "Unbuilt Intentions: towards a new phenomenology of cities and architecture" and "Redacted Distillations: Le Corbusier's transformative erasures". He was the editor of The Correa Report, a newsletter developing a new consciousness of traditional sustainability. He is the author of "Seven Recipes for the New Urbanism." This book presents an irreverent view of seven magical recipes at the heart of the New Urbanism movement: memory, suburban dysfunction, intellectual precedents, region and ecology, urban form, building type and cultural representation. A number of admonitions and a thrilling professional agenda (cleverly disguised as metaphysical denials and affirmations) are followed by a portfolio of breathtaking projects, drawings and photographs. This is one of the freshest expressions of New Urbanism by one of its most zealous practitioners and scholars. He has also written a chapter in "Reflections of Seaside" a book edited by Dhiru Thadani and winner of the Gerd Albers Award in 2021. His chapter on Latin American for Routledge's "Routledge Companion for Global Heritage Conservation", edited by Vinayak Bharne and Trudi Sandmeir, is an enlightening essay on complexity theory applications to redevelopment.

In 2008, he published a small pamphlet titled: "Self-Sufficient Urbanism: a vision of contraction for the non-distant future." Self-Sufficient Urbanism is the most comprehensive town design mitigation and adaptation plan available in the transitional market of today. It encourages the creation of sustainable urban villages and rural settlements where almost everything needed for daily living is found, produced, created, used, re-used and recycled at walking distance from an identifiable center and in closed economic loops. Self-sufficient Urbanism focuses on the "re-localization" of resources, and on the advocacy and development of technologies attempting to eliminate the existent fossil fuel dependency and reduce the current rate of carbon emissions. His introductory pamphlet reviews the social, economic and design implications of combining the existing predicament of global warming and Peak oil and offers a positive solution of contraction, simplicity and human dignity.

He has been a frequent collaborator of the Town Paper, New Towns, the SNU Report, The New Urbanism: Comprehensive Report and Best Practices Guide, PLACES, the New Urban News, the New Urbanism Council Reports, and other national publications. Correa is a member of the editorial board of "Cuadernos de Arquitectura y Nuevo Urbanismo", in Mexico. He was a research collaborator for "The New Civic Art: elements of town planning" and the author of the initial Sustainability Module for the SmartCode. In a New Towns article, Correa was characterized as a person who "… approaches each day's task with the weight of the world on his shoulders then unburdens himself by sharing his discoveries with an engaging demeanor that seeks to make you both friend and follower."

=== Awards ===
Correa has been widely recognized. He has been the recipient of the Faculty of the Year Award at the Master in Real Estate Development, the Wooddrow W. Wilkins Award for Outstanding Teaching, and the Excellence in Civic Engagement Award at the University of Miami. He is also the recipient of the Miami Training Mentorship Recognition Award from the Climate Reality Corps under the tutelage of Former Vice-president Al Gore. He received the bi-annual 2014 Charles A. Barrett Memorial Award has received a Lifetime Achievement Award from the South Florida Chapter of the American Institute of Architects for his work as an Urban Designer; he was named a "Sustainability Icon" by Climate Culture International; he received a Point of Light Award from the State of Florida for his reconstruction work with Team Punta Gorda in Punta Gorda, Florida.

His firm was selected to participate in the New Urbanism Gulf-Coast Reconstruction Charrette after Hurricane Katrina. He is one of the 16 architects and town planners published by Peter Katz in his seminal book: "The New Urbanism: toward an architecture of community"; he is also the recipient of numerous urban planning and architectural awards stretching four continents, including: a Chinese Government Award, the first place at the Marina de Cope competition in Spain, an Honorable Mention shared with Roberto Behar at the Williamsburg Competition; a Progressive Architecture citation for his redevelopment work in Riviera Beach with Mark Schimmenti and his former partners at Dover Kohl; a shared award with OBM International in the International Cities Competition in Dubai for his design leadership and contribution to the new town of The Wave in Oman; a citation to represent the United States in the Bienal de Arquitectura in Chile. Jaime Correa has lectured to students at the Bauhaus/Dessau, Harvard, Notre Dame, MIT, Tecnologico de Monterrey in Querétaro, Mexico, and in Argentina, Italy, Peru, Guatemala, and Colombia.

=== Architecture firm ===
Correa's professional practice includes the design, research, and land use planning of several hundred Inner City Neighborhoods, New Towns, Districts, Corridors, Regions, Blocks, Streets, University Campuses, Informal Urban Areas (shanty towns), Public Spaces, Public Art, etc.

Jaime Correa and Associates, his professional firm in Miami, is a collaborative practice involved in urban design, town planning, sustainability, public civic art, and architectural design projects of many types and scales.

The firm celebrates the simplicity of American life, the beauty of rational and metaphysical systems of representation, the uniqueness of place, the engagement of history, the evolution of culture, the distinctiveness of world geographies, the beauty of nature, our own human experience, the potentialities of contemporary and appropriate technologies in both practical and academic arenas, alternative energy, the everyday, and the end of unbridled globalization. His latest professional work includes: a research series on urban evacuation and adaptation, colossal projects for the forthcoming climate disruption, public space interventions in the City of Lauderdale-by-the-Sea, the redevelopment of an Industrial District in Miami, eight mini-skyscrapers in Medellin, urban design advisory for Coral Gables, Florida, charrette collaborations in Coral Springs, Florida, and the North End of West Palm Beach, Florida, urban "letterscapes", various collaborations in Central and South America, including for the towns of Cayala and El Naranjo, in Guatemala and La Serena, in Chile, and the master planning and implementation of "The Wave", a new town with 50,000 residents in Muscat, Oman in collaboration with OBM International and partners around the world.

The firm is currently engaged in a new type of urban design practice focused on social innovations, bottom-up urbanism, the creation of real estate value through morphogenetic disruptions, generative codes, self-organization and its interconnection with structured and unstructured information. His projects explore: incremental master planning, super-graphics and the physical representation of information in urban areas, informal urbanism, morphogenesis, colossal refugee camps, tiny gap-housing, self-organizing redevelopment, public space design, big data mining, the Internet of Things, and sea-level-rise adaptation, and evacuation.

== Publications ==
- Correa, Jaime (2009). Seven Recipes for the New Urbanism. Lulu Enterprises. ISBN 978-0-557-03265-5
- Correa, Jaime (2008). Self-Sufficient Urbanism: A vision of contraction for the non-distant future. Lulu Enterprises. ISBN 978-0-557-01940-3
- Correa, Jaime (2008). "The New Urbanism Ark: A New Environmental Module for the SmartCode", Council Report VII: Green Architecture and Urbanism, pg 31.
- Correa, Jaime (2006) "Counterpoint: Transect Transgressions", Places: Vol. 18: No. 1.
- CNU Florida (2005). A Guidebook to New Urbanism in Florida, 2005.
- Correa, Jaime (2004)."The New Pragmatists: GenXers And Their Quest For Authentic Urbanism", New Towns, Fall 2004
- Correa, Jaime (2004). "Cliches and Misdemeanors: The Architecture of the New Urbanism", The Town Paper, VOL. 6, NO. 2, Summer 2004
- Correa, Jaime (2004). "Ethnic Enclaves in the Urbanism of America", The Town Paper, VOL. 6, NO. 1 Spring 2004
- Duany, Andrés, Elizabeth Plater-Zyberk, and Robert Alminana (2003). The New Civic Art: Elements of Town Planning. New York: Rizzoli International Publications. ISBN 0-8478-2186-2
- Correa, Jaime "Karl Brunner in Chile", The New City - La Nueva Ciudad, The Journal of the Graduate Program in Suburb and Town Design, School of Architecture, University of Miami: Volume 1 No. 1.
- Dutton, John (2002). THE NEW AMERICAN SUBURBANISM, New Urbanist theory and practice.
- Correa, Jaime (1998). "Santeria on the American City: the power of syncretism in architecture" 1997 ACSA Southeast Regional Conference Proceedings.
- Katz, Peter (1993). THE NEW URBANISM: toward an architecture of community McGraw Hill.
