= Transect (urban) =

The urban-to-rural transect is an urban planning model created by the New Urbanist Andrés Duany. The transect defines a series of zones that transition from sparse rural farmhouses to the dense urban core. Each zone is fractal in that it contains a similar transition from the edge to the center of the neighborhood. The transect is an important part of the New Urbanism and smart growth movements. Duany's firm DPZ has embodied the transect philosophy into their SmartCode generic planning code for municipal ordinances.

The importance of transect planning is particularly seen as a contrast to modern Euclidean zoning and suburban development. In these patterns, large areas are dedicated to a single purpose, such as housing, offices, shopping, and they can only be accessed via major roads. The transect, by contrast, decreases the necessity for long-distance travel by any means.

== History ==
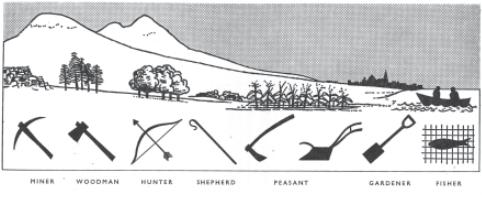
Patrick Geddes, Valley Section, 1909

The concept of the transect was borrowed from ecology. Ecological transects are used to describe changes in habitat over some gradient such as a change in topography or distance from a water body. Patrick Geddes, in his Valley Section of the early 20th century was among the first to proclaim that human settlement should be analyzed in the context of its natural region. Transects were later used by Ian McHarg in Design with Nature.

== Breakdown of the transect ==
A major feature of transect planning is that it incorporates a variety of residential and commercial spaces into a single neighborhood. A typical neighborhood would consist of a light commercial area with a bank, general store, pub, coffee shop, and apartments. Moving outwards from the center, residential density would gradually decrease starting with apartments to townhouses to fully detached houses. The central area would be a focus of transit and ideally be within walking distance from any point in the neighborhood.

The Transect has six zones, moving from rural to urban. It begins with two that are entirely rural in character: Rural preserve (protected areas in perpetuity); and Rural reserve (areas of high environmental or scenic quality that are not currently preserved, but perhaps should be). The transition zone between countryside and town is called the Edge, which encompasses the most rural part of the neighborhood, and the countryside just beyond. The Edge is primarily single family homes. Although Edge is the most purely residential zone, it can have some mixed-use, such as civic buildings (schools are particularly appropriate for the Edge). Next is General, the largest zone in most neighborhoods. General is primarily residential, but more urban in character (somewhat higher density with a mix of housing types and a slightly greater mix of uses allowed). At the urban end of the spectrum are two zones which are primarily mixed use: Center (this can be a small neighborhood center or a larger town center, the latter serving more than one neighborhood); and Core (serving the region — typically a central business district). Core is the most urban zone.

The character—from rural to highly urban—of each of the zones in the transect continuum is made up not only of the land uses and activities that take place in that zone, but the degree of development and the typology of that development. In contrast to conventional 20th-century zoning, which was for the most part concerned with land uses and activities and largely ignored issues of typology and community form (also known as urban form), transect-based zoning codes take up the issue of development typology as a principal concern.

== Potentials ==
The potential of the transect as an urban planning tool lies in:

1. Education: it is easy to understand
2. Coding: it can be directly translated into the familiar legal framework of Euclidean Zoning districts particularly in Canada and the United States.
3. Immersive environments: this is one where all of the elements of the human environment work together to create something that is greater than the sum of the parts.

The transect contains other features: it creates a framework to control and promote growth in certain areas; it intends to increase pedestrian life, local safety, and community identity; and, it provides tools to protect and restore natural environments.

== Challenges to implementation ==
Many of the features of transect planning cannot be reproduced without a change to municipal ordinances. For example, the transect encourages storefronts to push forward to the sidewalk, to allow window shopping, and push parking lots to the rear. In many municipalities, this design would not be permitted today under town planning bylaws. Hence, any effort to implement the principles of the transect must be accompanied by code changes (See the development of SmartCode).

== Regions that have implemented the transect ==
- Albemarle County, Virginia
