= Biophilic design =

Nature-inspired design

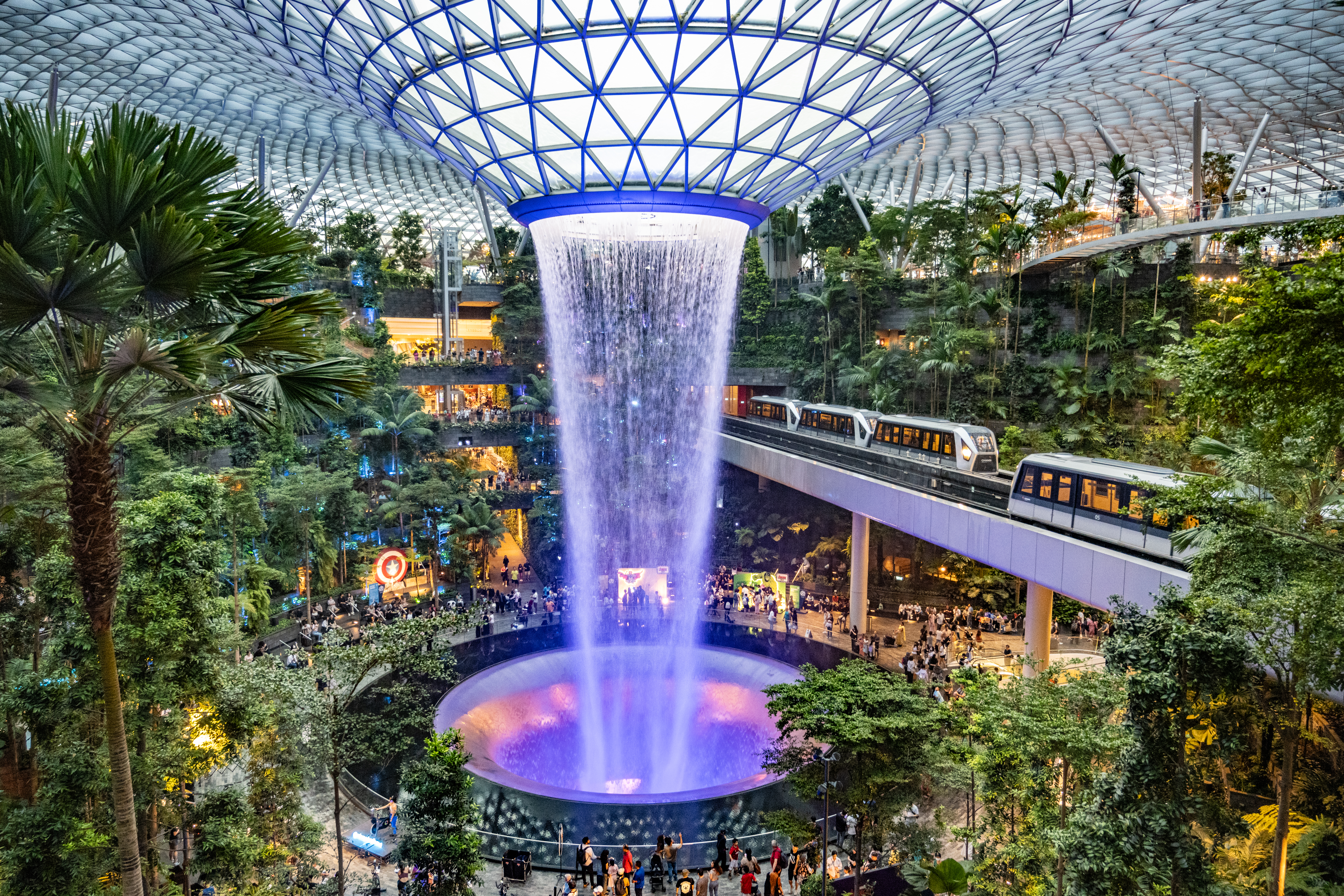
Singapore Changi Airport is a famous example of biophilic design

Biophilic design seeks to increase people’s connectivity to nature and nature-like design to improve their health and well-being. By increasing natural features like sunlight, biophilic design offers health, environmental, and economic benefits for people and urban environments, with few drawbacks. Although the term was coined in the 20th century, biophilic design elements can be seen in ancient architecture. While the design features that characterize biophilic design were all traceable in preceding sustainable design guidelines, the new term sparked wider interest and lent academic credibility.

== Biophilia hypothesis ==
The word "biophilia" was first introduced by a psychoanalyst named Erich Fromm who stated that biophilia is the "passionate love of life and of all that is alive...whether in a person, a plant, an idea, or a social group" in his book The Anatomy of Human Destructiveness in 1973. Fromm's approach was that of a psychoanalyst (a person who studies the unconscious mind) and presented a broad spectrum as he called biophilia a biologically normal instinct.

The term has been used since by many scientists, and philosophers overall being adapted to several different areas of study. Some notable mentions of biophilia include Edward O. Wilson's book Biophilia (1984) where he took a biologist's approach and first coined the "biophilia hypothesis" and popularized the notion. Wilson defined biophilia as "the innate tendency to focus on life and lifelike processes", claiming a link with nature is not only physiological (as Fromm suggested) but has a genetic basis. The biophilia hypothesis suggests that humans have an inherited need to connect with nature and other biotic forms due to our evolutionary dependence on it for survival and personal fulfillment. This idea is relevant in daily life – humans travel and spend money to sightsee in national parks and nature preserves, relax on beaches, hike mountains, and explore jungles. Further, many sports revolve around nature such as skiing, mountain biking, and surfing. From a home perspective, people are more likely to spend more on houses that have views of nature; buyers are willing to spend 7% more on homes with excellent landscaping, 58% more on properties that look at water, and 127% more on those that are waterfront. Humans also value companionship with animals.

== Biophobia ==
While biophilia refers to the inherent need to experience and love nature, biophobia is human's inherited fear of nature and animals. In the case of modern life, humans urge to separate themselves from nature and move towards technology; a cultural drive where people tend to associate with human artifacts, interests, and managed activities. Some anxieties of the natural environment are inherited from threats seen in anthropocentric evolution: this includes fear of snakes, spiders, and blood. In relation to buildings, biophobia can be induced through the use of bright colors, heights, enclosed spaces, darkness, and large open spaces are major contributors to occupant discomfort.

== Dimensions ==
Considered as one of the pioneers of biophilic design, Stephen Kellert has created a framework where nature in the built environment is used in a way that satisfies human needs – his principles are meant to celebrate and show respect for nature, and provide an enriching urban environment that is multisensory. The dimensions and attributes that define Kellert's biophilic framework are below.

=== Direct experience of nature ===
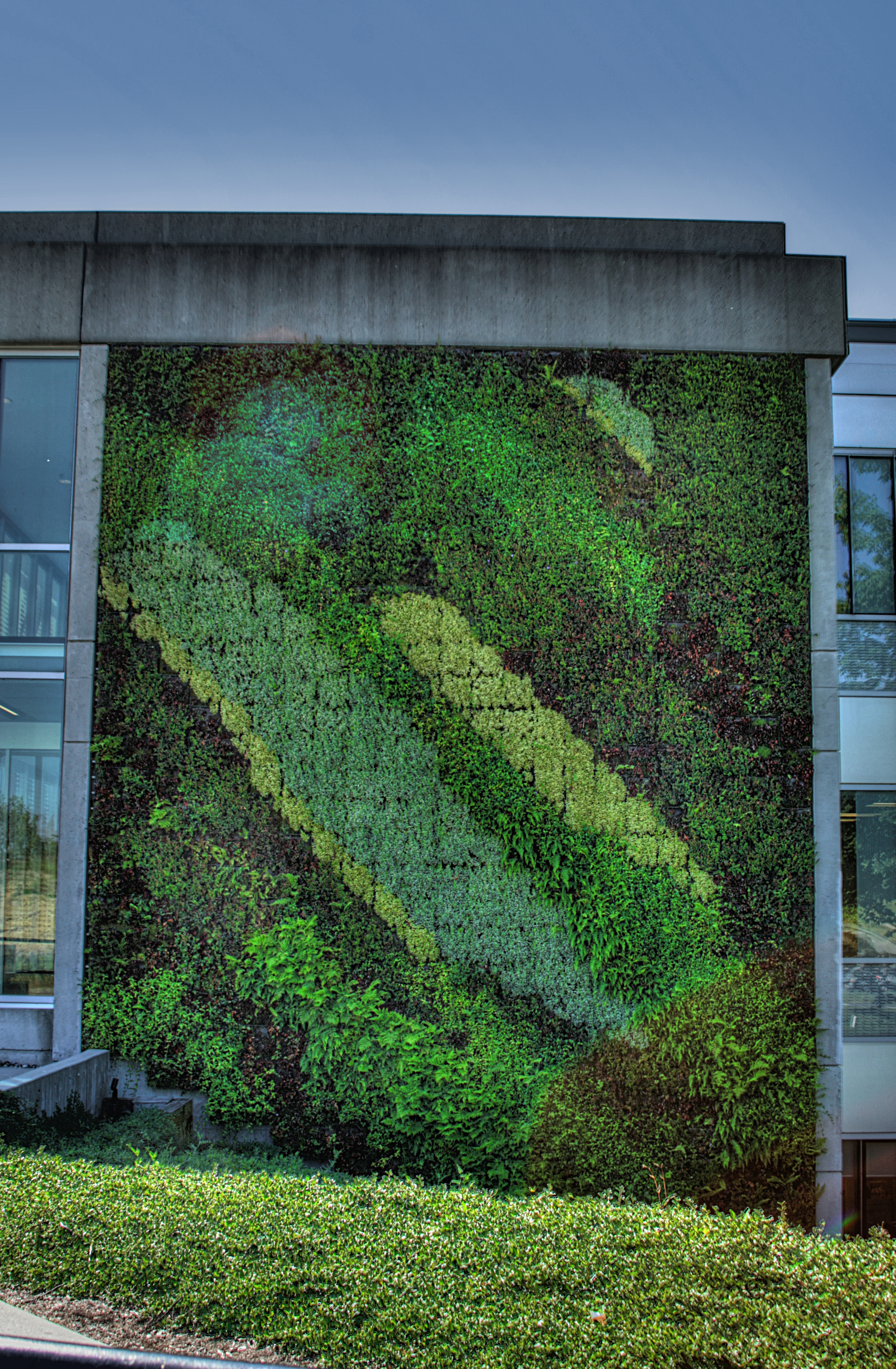
An example of a green wall at Simon Fraser University, in British Columbia

Direct experience refers to tangible contact with natural features:

- Light: Allows orientation of time of day and season, and is attributed to wayfinding and comfort; light can also cause natural patterns and form, movements and shadows. In design, this can be applied through clerestories, reflective materials, skylights, glass, and atriums. This provides well-being and interest from occupants.
- Air: Ventilation, temperature, and humidity are felt through air. Such conditions can be applied through the use of windows and other passive strategies, but most importantly the variation in these elements can promote occupant comfort and productivity.
- Water: Water is multisensory and can be used in buildings to provide movement, sounds, touch, and sight. In design it can be incorporated through water bodies, fountains, wetlands, and aquariums; people have a strong connection to water and when used, it can decrease stress and increase health, performance, and overall satisfaction.
- Plants: Bringing vegetation to the exterior and interior spaces of the building provides a direct relationship to nature. This should be abundant (i.e., make use of green walls or many potted plants) and some vegetation should flower; plants can increase physical health, performance, and productivity and reduce stress for building occupants.
- Animals: Aquariums, gardens, animal feeders, and green roofs are some of the methods for providing interactions with animals. This interaction with promotes interest, mental stimulation, and pleasure. Bird habitat, for example, allows for birdsong.
- Weather: Weather can be observed directly through windows and transitional spaces, but it can also be simulated through the manipulation of air within the space; awareness of weather signified human fitness and survival in ancient times and now promotes awareness and mental stimulation.
- Natural landscapes: This is done through creating self-sustaining ecosystems into the built environment. Given human evolution and history, people tend to enjoy savannah-like landscapes as they depict spaciousness and an abundance of natural life. Contact with these types of environments can be done through vistas and or direct interactions such as gardens. Such landscapes are known to increase occupant satisfaction.
- Fire: This natural element is hard to incorporate, however when implemented correctly into the building, it provides color, warmth, and movement, all of which are appealing and pleasing to occupants.

=== Indirect experience of nature ===
Indirect experience refers to contact with images and or representations of nature:

- Images of Nature: This has been proven to be emotionally and intellectually satisfying to occupants; images of nature can be implemented through paintings, photos, sculptures, murals, videos, etcetera.
- Natural Materials: People prefer natural materials as they can be mentally stimulating. Natural materials are susceptible to the patina of time; this change invokes responses from people. These materials can be incorporated into buildings through the use of wood and stone. Interior design can use natural fabrics and furnishings. Leather has often been included as recommended Biophilic material however with the awareness of animal agriculture (leather being a co-product of the meat industry) as a major contributor to climate change faux, or plant-based, leathers created from mushroom, pineapple skin, or cactus are now seen as viable alternatives. It is also seen that to feel, and be, closer to nature and animals to destroy them in the pursuit of this is counter-productive and in conflict with the philosophy of Biophilia.
- Natural Colors: Natural colors or "earth-tones", are those that are commonly found in nature and are often subdued tones of brown, green, and blue. When using colors in buildings, they should represent these natural tones. Brighter colors should only be used sparingly – one study found that red flowers on plants were found to be fatiguing and distracting by occupants.
- Simulations of Natural Light and Air: In areas where natural forms of ventilation and light cannot be achieved, creative use of interior lighting and mechanical ventilation can be used to mimic these natural features. Designers can do this through variations in lighting through different lighting types, reflective mediums, and natural geometries that the fixture can shine through; natural airflow can be imitated through mild changes in temperature, humidity, and air velocity.
- Naturalistic Shapes: Natural shapes and forms can be achieved in architectural design through columns and nature-based patterns on facades - including these different elements into spaces can change a static space into an intriguing and appealing complex area.
- Evoking Nature: This uses characteristics found in nature to influence the structural design of the project. These may be things that may not occur in nature, rather elements that represent natural landscapes such as mimicking different plant heights found in ecosystems, and or mimicking particular animal, water, or plant features.
- Information Richness: This can be achieved by providing complex, yet not noisy environments that invoke occupant curiosity and thought. Many ecosystems are complex and filled with different abiotic and biotic elements – in such the goal of this attribute is to include these elements into the environment of the building.
- Change and the Patina of Time: People are intrigued by nature and how it changes, adapts, and ages over time, much like ourselves. In buildings, this can be accomplished by using organic materials that are susceptible to weathering and color change – this allows for us to observe slight changes in our built environment over time.
- Natural Geometries: The design of facades or structural components can include the use of repetitive, varied patterns that are seen in nature (fractals). These geometries can also have hierarchically organized scales and winding flow rather than be straight with harsh angles. For instance, commonly used natural geometries are the honeycomb pattern and ripples found in water.
- Biomimicry: This is a design strategy that imitates uses found in nature as solutions for human and technical problems. Using these natural functions in construction can entice human creativity and consideration of nature.
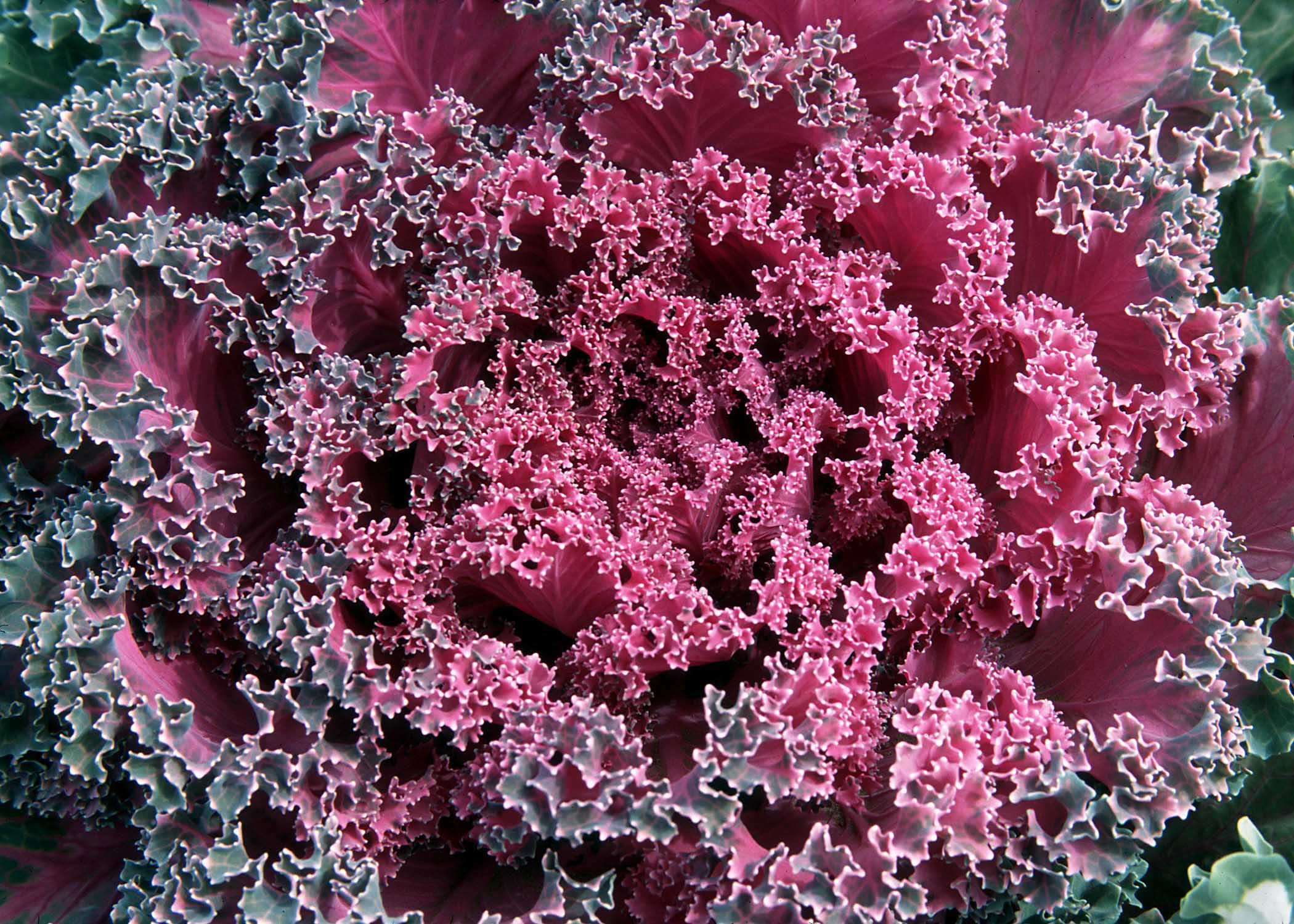
  Example of a natural fractal

=== Experience of space and place ===
The experience of space and place uses spatial relationships to enhance well-being:

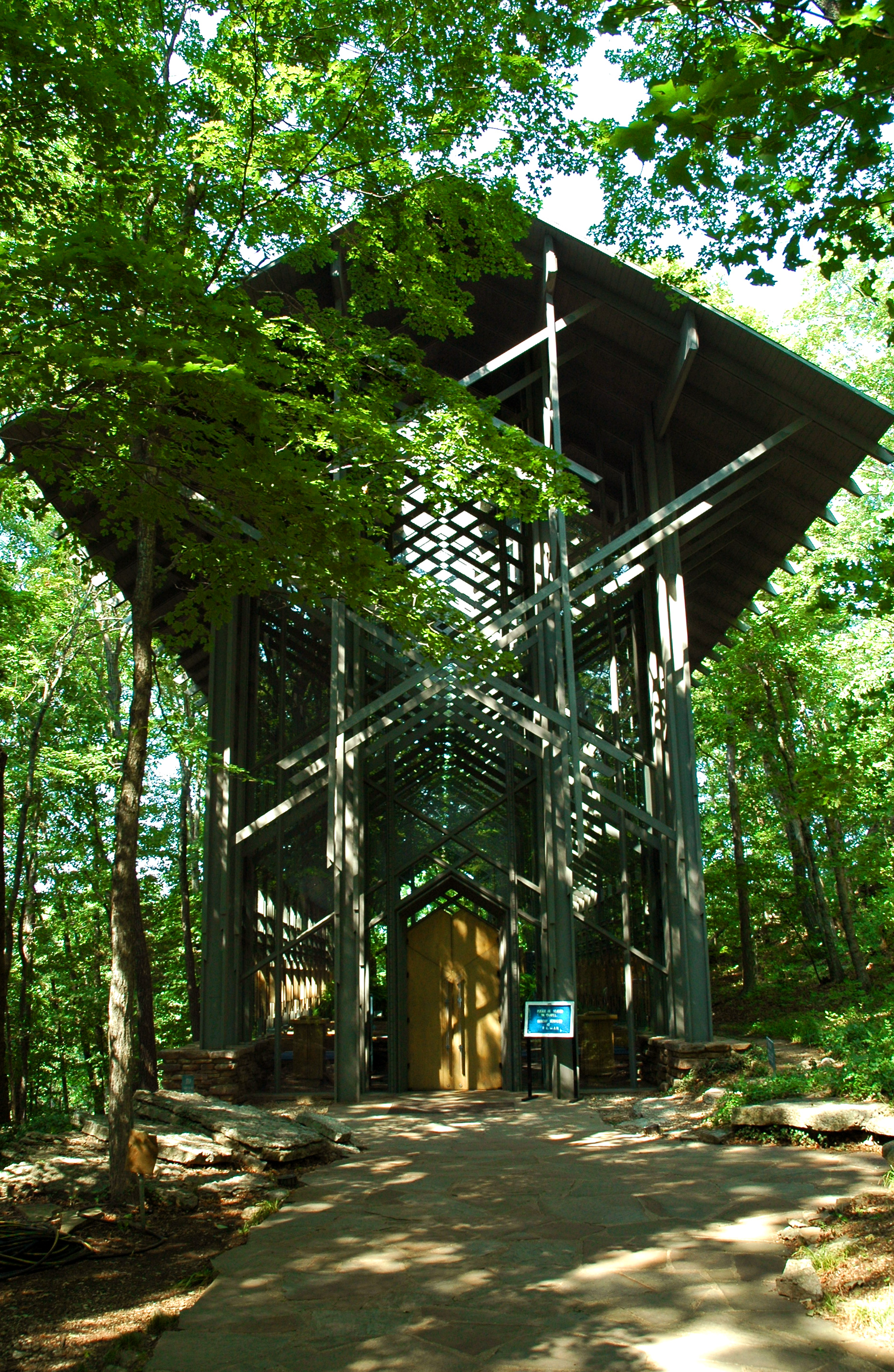
Thorncrown Chapel is often seen as a model of biophilic design due to it having all three of Kellert's experiences.

- Prospect and Refuge: Refuge refers to the building's ability to provide comfortable and nurturing interiors (alcoves, dimmer lighting), while prospect emphasizes horizons, movement, and sources of danger. Examples of design elements include balconies, alcoves, lighting changes, and areas spaciousness (savannah environment).
- Organized Complexity: This principle is meant to simulate the need for controlled variability; this is done in design through repetition, change, and detail of the building's architecture.
- Integration of Parts: When different parts comprise a whole, it provides satisfaction for occupants: design elements include interior spaces using clear boundaries and or the integration of a central focal point.
- Transitional Spaces: This element aims to connect interior spaces with the outside or create comfort by providing access from one space to another environment through the use of porches, decks, atriums, doors, bridges, fenestrations, and foyers.
- Mobility: The ability for people to comfortably move between spaces, even when complex; it provides the feeling of security for occupants and can be done through making clear points of entry and egress.
- Cultural and Ecological Attachment to Place: Creating a cultural sense of place in the built environment creates human connection and identity. This is done by incorporating the area's geography and history into the design. Ecological identity is done through the creation of ecosystems that promote the use of native flora and fauna.

Each of these experiences are meant to be considered individually when using biophilia in projects, as there is no one right answer for one building type. Each building's architect(s) and project owner(s) must collaborate to include the biophilic principles they believe fit within their scope and most effectively reach their occupants.

== City-scale ==
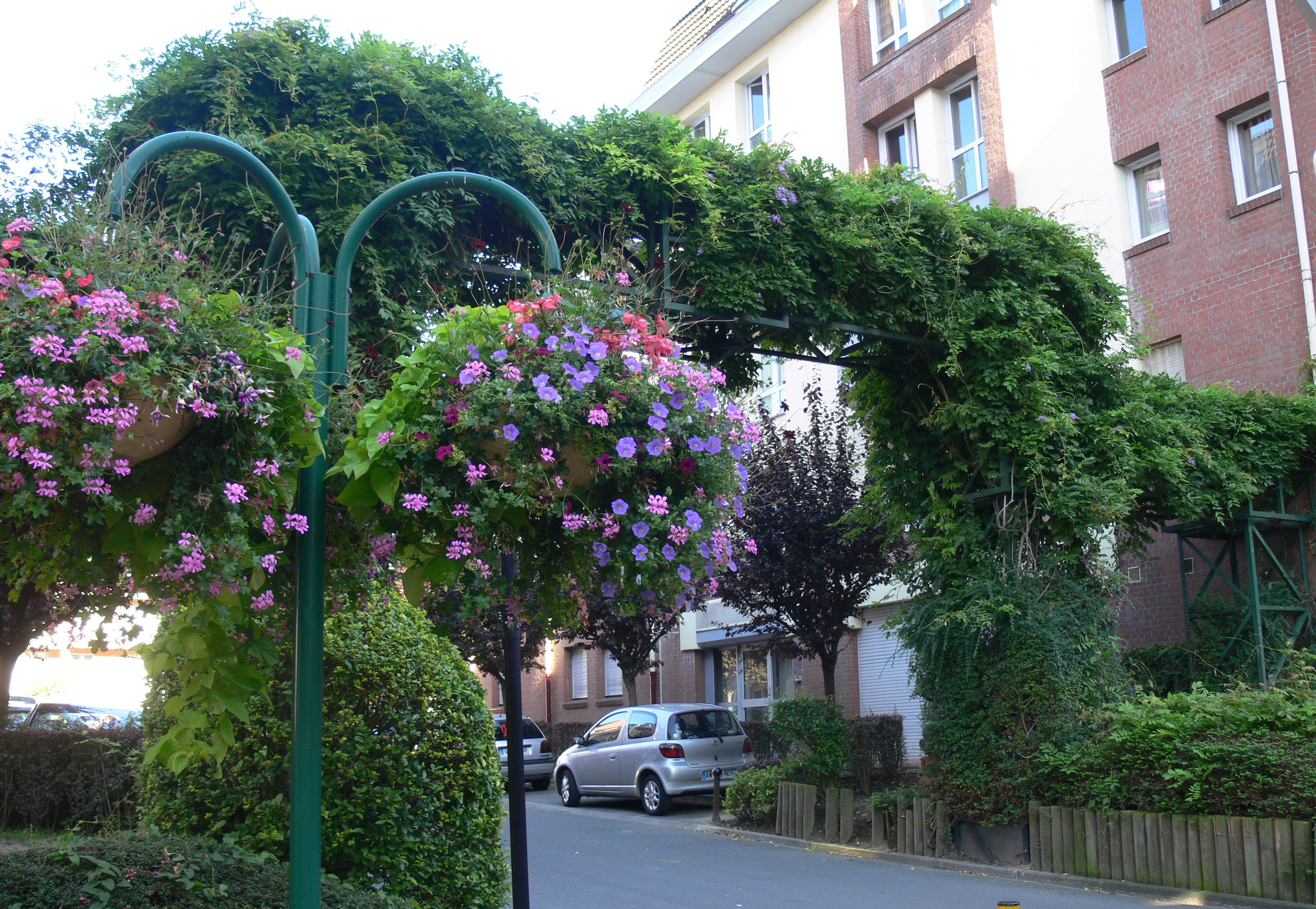
A green corridor in Lille

Timothy Beatley believes the key objective of biophilic cities is to create an environment where the residents want to actively participate in, preserve, and connect with the natural landscape that surrounds them. He established ways to achieve this through a framework of infrastructure, governance, knowledge, and behavior; these dimensions can also be indicators of existing biophilic attributes that already exist in current cities.

- Biophilic Conditions and Infrastructure: The idea that a certain number of people at any given time should be near a green space or park. This can be done through the creation of integrated ecological networks and walking trails throughout the city, the designation of certain portions of land area for vegetation and forests, green and biophilic building design features, and the use of flora and fauna throughout the city.
- Biophilic Activities: This refers to the increased amount of time spent outside and visiting parks, longer outdoor periods at schools, improved foot traffic across the city, improved participation in community gardens and conservatory clubs, larger participation in local volunteer efforts.
- Biophilic Attitudes and Knowledge: In areas with urban biophilic design elements, there will be an improved number of residents who care about nature and can identify local native species; resident curiosity of their local ecosystems also increases.
- Biophilic Institutions and Governance: Local government bodies allocate part of the budget to nature and biophilic activities. Indicators of this include increased regulation that requires more green and biophilic design principles, grant programs that promote the use of nature and biophilia, the inclusion of natural history museums and educational programs, and increased number of nature non-governmental organizations and community groups.

Based on Kellert's dimensions, biophilic product design dimensions have also been presented.

== Benefits ==
Biophilic design is argued to have a wealth of benefits for building occupants and urban environments through improving connections to nature. For cities, many believe the biggest proponent of the concept is its ability to make the city more resilient to any environmental stressor it may face.

=== Health benefits ===
==== Improved mental health ====
Alvarsson, et al. found that elements such as nature sounds, improved physiological response 9-37% faster than traditional urban noise after introduction of a psychological stressor. A 2023 literature review of biophilic design in healthcare settings suggests that current literature is limited to examining the physiological impacts of psychological outcomes from biophilic design, specifically indoor plants. In other words, the direct psychological effects, like changes in positive emotions and feelings, of biophilic design require more study.

==== Reduction in stress and painkiller usage ====
Studies suggest that indoor plants are beneficial for reducing stress and increasing pain tolerance. For example, in an experiment that exposed subjects to natural and urban environments, the physiological and verbal measures, such as vital signs, blood pressure and response to surveys, showed that recovery was faster and more holistic when subjects were exposed to the natural environment. The authors posited that the pattern of physiological findings suggested that responses to nature had a Parasympathetic nervous system (which regulates organs and glands supporting the body while at rest) component. Another study demonstrated that views of nature from a glass window are mentally restorative for occupants, and result in a better physiological response than a screen showing nature or a blank wall. To partly address the potentially confounding effects of daylight on physiological response, the authors looked at the relationship between heart rate recovery (as a measure of recovering from a stressor) and light intensity but did not find a significant correlation. This suggests that there is something about the nature view aside from light, that enhances its restoration capabilities as compared to the other conditions.

When researching the effects of biophilia on hospital patients, Peter Newman and Jana Soderlund found that by increasing vista quality in hospital rooms depression and pain in patients is reduced, which in turn shortened hospital stays from 3.67 days to 2.6 days.

==== Cognitive performance ====
Aristizabal et al. studied the effects of biophilic design on cognitive performance in an office setting. They found that participants' ability to hold information in their mind while performing a single task (working memory) and suppress dominant responses (response inhibition) improved across all biophilic strategies, particularly those that were auditory and multisensory. Visual strategies included introduction of plants, digital projections, and fractal imagery, auditory strategies included sounds of nature, and multisensory interventions included a mix between the two. However, participant's' ability to switch between tasks and maintain attention was more complex. It improved in the auditory condition and worsened in the multisensory condition. This suggests that there is a balance to be struck between the introduction of multisensory biophilic strategies to improve working memory, while at the same time keep distractions to a minimum. Interestingly, participants were also more satisfied with the air movement accompanying the visual and multisensory biophilic interventions, even though air quality and circulation did not change during the study. A pilot experiment by Sanchez et al. similarly finds that biophilic design in office environments contributes positively to performance and creativity.

==== Social connectivity and increased physical exercise ====
In biophilic cities, Andrew Dannenberg, et al. indicated that there are higher levels of social connectivity and better capability to handle life crises; this has resulted in lower crime rate levels of violence and aggression. The same study found that implementing outdoor facilities such as impromptu gymnasiums like the "Green Gym" in the United Kingdom, allow people to help clear overgrown vegetation, build walking paths, plant foliage, and more readily exercise (walking, running, climbing, etc.); this has been proven to build social capital, increase physical activity, better mental health and quality of life. Further, Dannenberg, et al. also found that children growing up in green neighborhoods are seen to have lower levels of asthma; decreased mortality rates and health disparities between the wealthy and poor were also observed in greener neighborhoods.

=== Mental health benefits ===
Highly prevalent in nature, fractal patterns, biophilic patterns possess self-similar components that repeat at varying size scales. The perceptual experience of human-made environments can be impacted with inclusion of these natural patterns. Previous work has demonstrated consistent trends in preference for and complexity estimates of fractal patterns. However, limited information has been gathered on the impact of other visual judgments. Here we examine the aesthetic and perceptual experience of fractal 'global-forest' designs already installed in humanmade spaces and demonstrate how fractal pattern components are associated with positive psychological experiences that can be utilized to promote occupant wellbeing. These designs are composite fractal patterns consisting of individual fractal 'tree-seeds' which combine to create a 'global fractal forest.' The local 'tree-seed' patterns, global configuration of tree-seed locations, and overall resulting 'global-forest' patterns have fractal qualities. These designs span multiple mediums yet are all intended to lower occupant stress without detracting from the function and overall design of the space. In this series of studies, we first establish divergent relationships between various visual attributes, with pattern complexity, preference, and engagement ratings increasing with fractal complexity compared to ratings of refreshment and relaxation which stay the same or decrease with complexity. Subsequently, we determine that the local constituent fractal ('tree-seed') patterns contribute to the perception of the overall fractal design, and address how to balance aesthetic and psychological effects (such as individual experiences of perceived engagement and relaxation) in fractal design installations. This set of studies demonstrates that fractal preference is driven by a balance between increased arousal (desire for engagement and complexity) and decreased tension (desire for relaxation or refreshment). Installations of these composite mid-high complexity 'global-forest' patterns consisting of 'tree-seed' components balance these contrasting needs, and can serve as a practical implementation of biophilic patterns in human-made environments to promote occupant wellbeing.

=== Environmental benefits ===
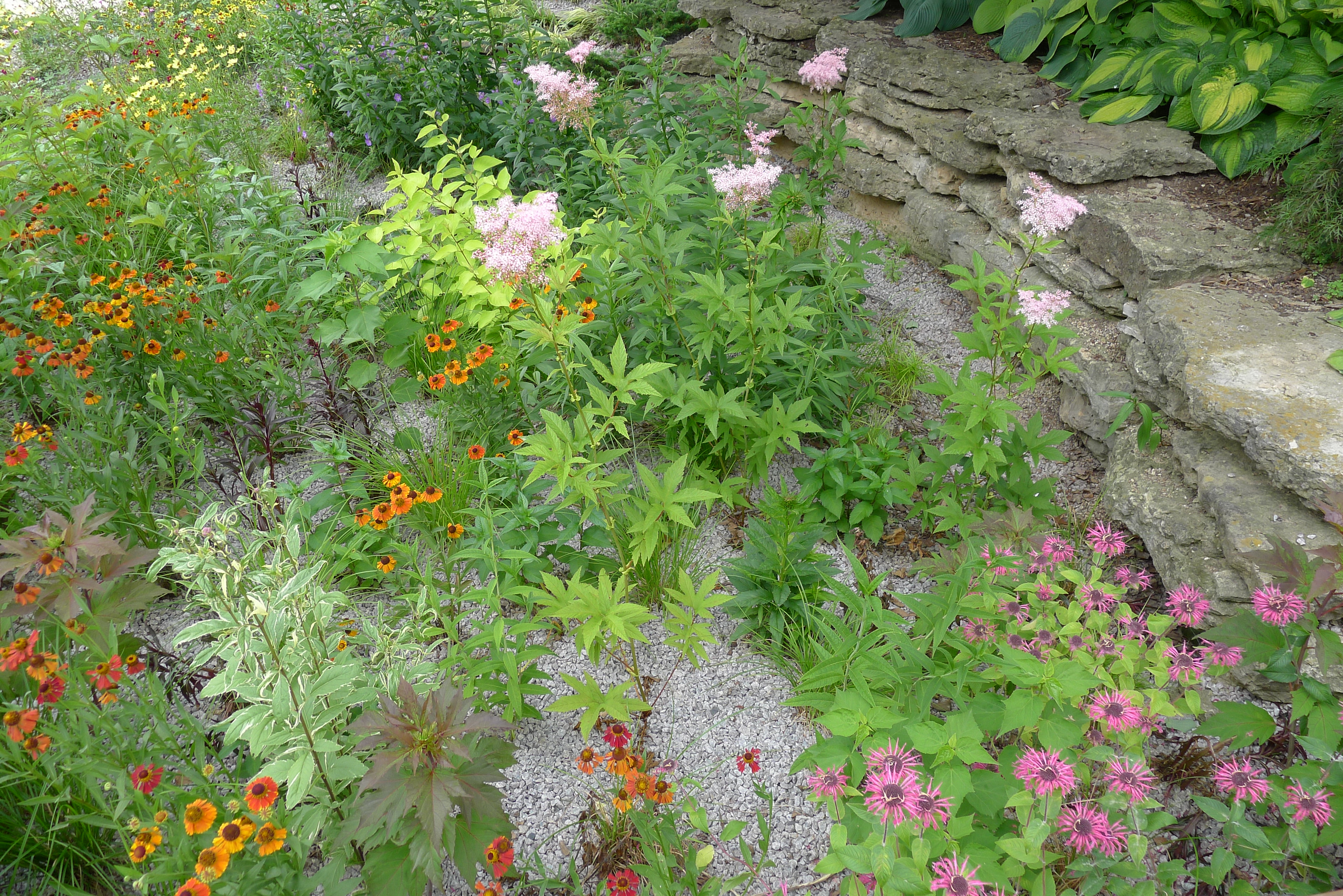
Example of a rain garden that increases infiltration

Some argue that by adding physical natural elements, such as plants, trees, rain gardens, and green roofs, to the built environment, buildings and cities can manage stormwater runoff better as there are fewer impervious surfaces and better infiltration. To maintain these natural systems in a cost-effective way, excess greywater can be reused to water the plants and greenery; vegetative walls and roofs also decrease polluted water as the plants act as biofilters. Adding greenery also reduces carbon emissions, the heat island effect, and increases biodiversity. Carbon is reduced through carbon sequestration in the plant's roots during photosynthesis. Green and high albedo rooftops and facades, and shading of streets and structures using vegetation can reduce the amount of heat absorption normally found in asphalt or dark surfaces – this can reduce heating and cooling needs by 25% and reduce temperature fluctuations by 50%. Further, adding green facades can increase the biodiversity of an area if native species are planted - the Khoo Teck Puat Hospital in Singapore has seen a resurgence of 103 species of butterflies onsite, thanks to their use of vegetation throughout the exterior of the building.

=== Economic benefits ===
Biophilia may have slightly higher costs due to the addition of natural elements that require maintenance, higher-priced organic items, etc., however, the perceived health and environmental benefits are believed to negate this. Peter Newman found that by adding biophilic design and landscapes, cities like New York City can see savings nearing $470 million due to increased worker productivity and $1.7 billion from reduced crime expenses. They also found that storefronts on heavily vegetated streets increased foot traffic and attracted consumers that were likely to spend 25% more; the same study showed that increasing daylighting through skylights in a store increase sales by 40% +/- 7%. Properties with biophilic design also benefit from higher selling prices, with many selling at 16% more than conventional buildings.

=== Sustainability and resilience ===
Beatley's biophilic pathways for urban resilience

On the urban scale, Timothy Beatley believes that biophilic design will allow cities to better adapt to stresses that occur from changes in climate and thus, local environments. To better show this, he created a biophilic cities framework, where pathways can be taken to increase the resilience and sustainability of cities. This includes three sections: Biophilic Urbanism - the physical biophilic and green measures that can be taken to increase the resilience of the city, Adaptive Capacity - how the community's behaviors will adapt as a result of these physical changes, and Resilient Outcomes - what can happen if both of these steps are achieved.

Under the Biophilic Urbanism section, one of the ways a city can increase resilience is by pursuing the biophysical pathway – by safeguarding and promoting the inclusion of natural systems, the natural protective barrier of the city is increased. For example, New Orleans is a city that has built over its natural wet plains and has exposed themselves to flooding. It is estimated that if they kept the bayous intact, the city could save $23 billion yearly in storm protection.

In the Adaptive Capacity section, Beatley states that the commitment to place and home pathway creates stimulating and interesting nature environments for residents – this will create stronger bonds to home, which will increase the likelihood that citizens will take care of where they live. He goes further in saying that in times of shock or stress, these people are more likely to rebuild and or support the community instead of fleeing. This may also increase governmental action to protect the city from future disasters.

By achieving biophilic urbanism and adaptive capacity, Beatley believes that one of the biggest resilient outcomes of this framework will be increased adaptability of the residents. Because the steps leading to resilience encourage people to be outside walking and participating in activities, the citizens become healthier and more physically fit; it has been found that those who take walks in nature experience decreased depression, anger, and increased vigor, versus those who walk in interior environments.

== Use in building standards ==
Given the increased information supporting the benefits of biophilic design, organizations are beginning to incorporate the concept into their standards and rating systems to encourage building professionals to use biophilia in their projects. As of now, the most prominent supporters of biophilic design are the WELL Building Standard and the Living Building Challenge.

=== WELL Building Standard ===
The International WELL Building Institute uses biophilic design in their WELL Standard as a qualitative and quantitive metric. The qualitative metric must incorporate nature (environmental elements, natural lighting, and spatial qualities), natural patterns, and nature interaction within and outside the building; these efforts must be documented through professional narrative to be considered for certification. For the quantitative portion, projects must have outdoor biophilia (25% of the project must have accessible landscaped grounds and or rooftop gardens and 70% of that 25% must have plantings), indoor biophilia (plant beds and pots must cover 1% of the floor area and plant walls must cover 2% of the floor area), and water features (projects over 100,000 sq ft must have a water feature that is either 1.8 m in height or 4 m^{2} in floor area). Verification is enforced through assurance letters by the architects and owners, and by on-site spot checks. Generally, both metric types can be applied to every building type the WELL Standard addresses, with two exceptions: core and shell construction does not need to include quantitative interior biophilia and existing interiors do not need to include qualitative nature interaction.

=== Living Building Challenge ===
The International Living Future Institute is the creator of the living building challenge – a rigorous building standard that aims to maximize building performance. This standard classifies the use of a biophilic environment as an imperative element in their health and happiness section. The living building challenge requires that a framework be created that shows the following: how the project will incorporate nature through environmental features, light, and space, natural shapes and forms, natural patterns, and place-based relationships. The challenge also requires that the occupants be able to connect to nature directly through interaction within the interior and exterior of the building. These are then verified through a preliminary audit procedure.

== Criticisms ==
Biophilic, or sustainable design more generally, is increasingly embraced by major developers and green building certification companies. Substantial research supports the benefits of nature for human health and well-being. Some research suggests a 120-minute threshold for optimal nature exposure per week, demonstrating that significant health and well-being benefits depend on meeting this duration. The benefits plateau between 200 and 300 minutes, indicating weakening returns past this range. These effects are independent of physical activity and apply universally regardless of visit frequency or duration, emphasizing the need for biophilic design to prioritize meaningful exposure to nature rather than only aesthetic incorporation.

Some critics argue that biophilic design often prioritizes human benefits, like stress reduction, but overlooks support for biodiversity, as seen in many projects that add greenery for people's enjoyment without creating habitats or aiding local ecosystems. Adjustments, like using native plants, could make biophilic design beneficial for both people and nature. However, this approach can lead to "greenwashing," where natural elements are added superficially without providing meaningful sustainability benefits giving designs the appearance of environmental friendliness without addressing broader ecological or social goals.

Furthermore, although multisensory biophilic interventions can enhance stress reduction, cognitive performance, and workplace satisfaction, they often fall short in sustaining a sense of connectedness to nature, raising uncertainty about their broader psychological impact. Additionally, certain auditory interventions are less effective in achieving these outcomes.

Other concerns include the high costs and feasibility challenges associated with biophilic design principles. Implementing elements like green walls or water features can be expensive, both in initial setup and ongoing maintenance, which limits feasibility in low-income or cost-sensitive projects. Additionally, biophilic design often requires interdisciplinary collaboration and specialized expertise in ecology and environmental design, making it complex to implement effectively; this approach can increase project costs, extend timelines, and create potential coordination issues across construction teams.

Additionally, while biophilic design supports some Sustainable Development Goals (SDGs), such as health and well-being, it has a weaker impact on goals related to poverty reduction and social inclusivity, making its contributions uneven across the SDG spectrum.

== Building-scale examples of application ==
=== Church of Mary Magdalene ===
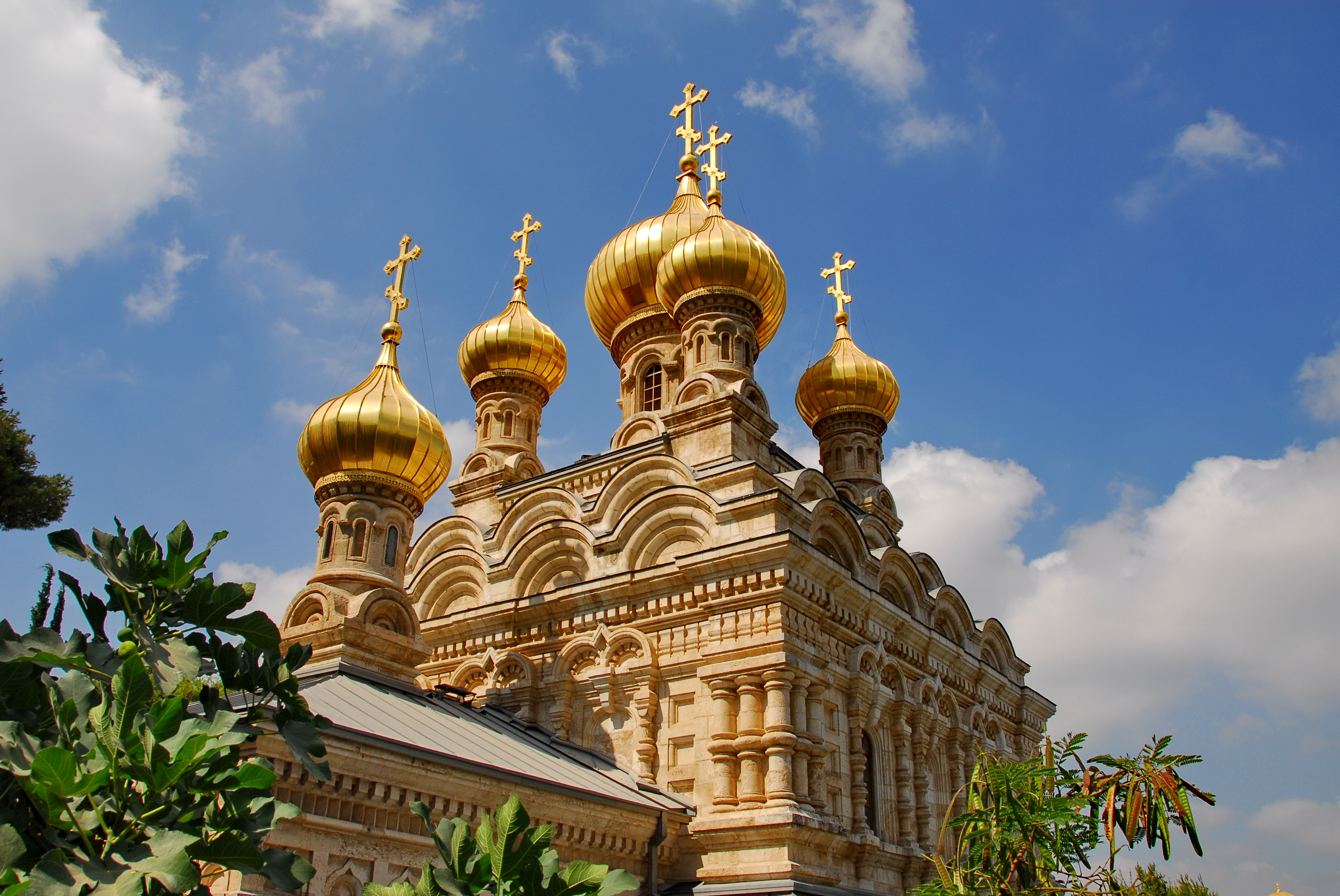
Exterior view of Maria Magdalena Church Jerusalem

The Church of Mary Magdalene is in Jerusalem and was consecrated in 1888. This church's architecture is biophilic in that it contains natural geometries, organized complexity, information richness, and organic forms (onion-shaped domes) and materials. On the exterior, complexity and order are shown through the repetitive use of domes, their scale, and placement. Inside, the church experiences symmetry and a savannah-like environment through its vaulting and domes – the columns also have leaf-like fronds, which represents images of nature. Prospect is explored through raised ceilings that have balconies and increased lighting; refuge is experienced in lower areas, where there are reduced lighting and alcoves and throughout, where small windows are encased by thick walls.

=== Fallingwater ===
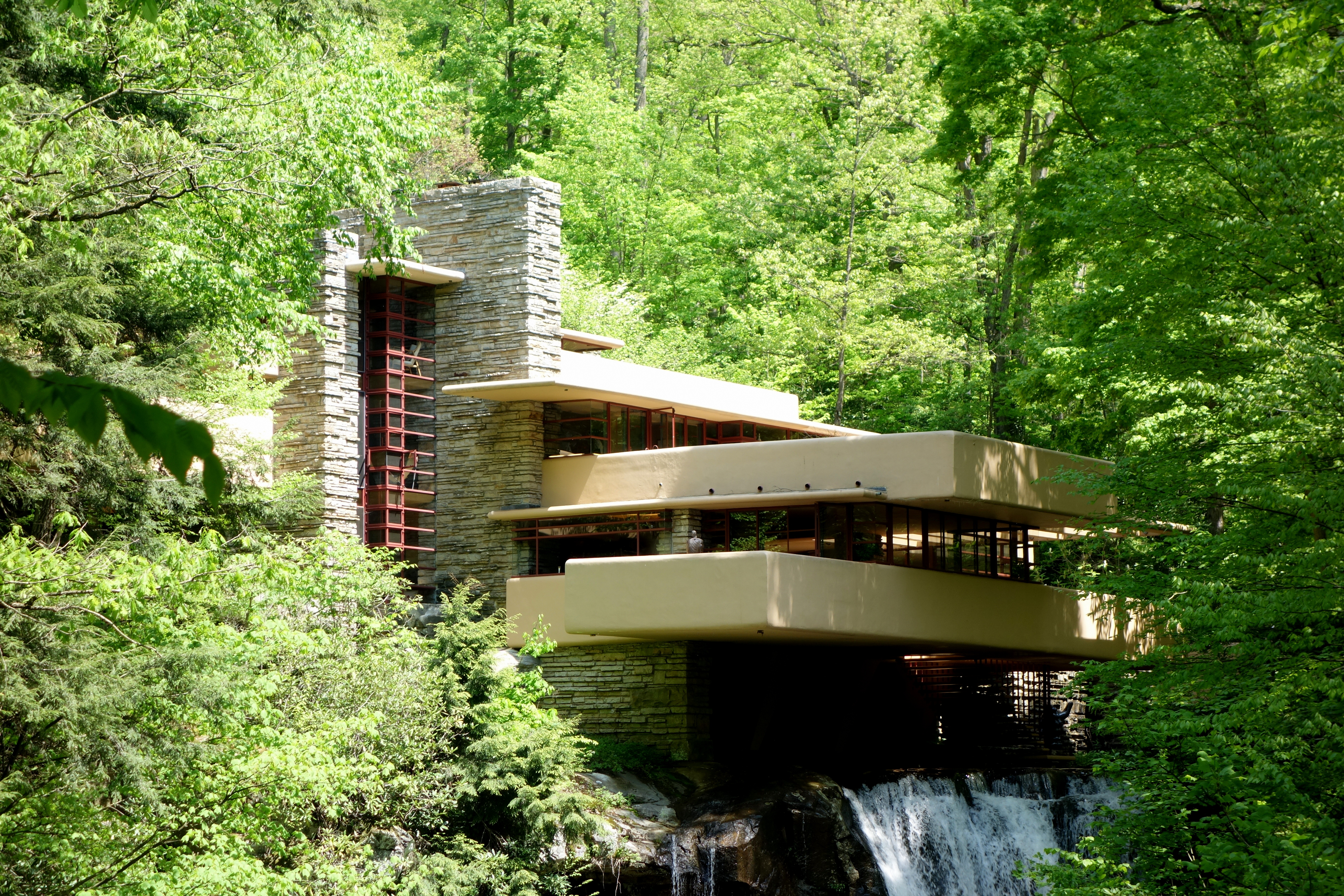
Frank Lloyd Wright's Fallingwater

Fallingwater, one of Frank Lloyd Wright's most famous buildings, exemplifies many biophilic features. The home has human-nature connectivity through the integrative use of the waterfall and stream in its architecture - the sound from these water features can be heard throughout the inside of the home. This allows visitors to feel like they are "participating" in nature rather than "spectating" it like they would be if the waterfall were downstream. In addition, the structure is built around existing foliage and encompasses the local geology by incorporating a large rock in the center of the living room. There are also many glass walls to connect the occupants to the surrounding woods and nature that is outdoors. To better the flow of the space, Wright included many transitional spaces in the home (porches and decks); he also enhanced the direct and indirect experiences of nature by using multiple fireplaces and a wealth of organic shapes, colors, and materials. His use of Kellert's biophilic design principles are prominent throughout the structure, even though this home was constructed before these ideas were developed.

=== Khoo Teck Puat Hospital ===
Referred to as a "garden hospital", KTP has an abundance of native plants and water features that surround its exterior. This inclusion of vegetation has increased the biodiversity of the local ecosystem, bringing butterflies and bird species; the rooftop of the hospital is also used by local residents to grow produce. Unlike many other hospitals, 15% of visitors come to Khoo Teck Puat for recreational reasons such as gardening or relaxing. This hospital´s design aims to increase the productivity of its doctors, the wellbeing of its visitors, and increase the healing speed and pain resilience of its patients. To do this, the designers incorporated greenery from the hospital's courtyard to its upper floors, where patients have balconies that are covered in scented foliage. The hospital is centered on the Yishun pond, and like Frank Lloyd Wright's Fallingwater, the architects made this natural feature part of the hospital by having water stream through its courtyard, creating the illusion that the water was "drawn" from the pond. The hospital also utilizes natural ventilation as much as possible in common areas and corridors by orienting them in the direction the north and southeast prevailing winds; this has reduced energy consumption by 60% and increased airflow by 20-30%. This creates thermally adequate environments for patients and medical staff alike. Using Kellert strategies above, it is apparent that most of the strategies used for Khoo Teck Puat are direct nature experiences. The hospital also uses transitional spaces to make occupants more connected to the outdoors and has organized complexity throughout its overall architectural design. KTP has created a sense of place for occupants and neighbors, as it acts as a communal place for both those who work there and live nearby.

=== Sandy Hook Elementary School ===
After the Sandy Hook Elementary School shooting in 2012, a new school was built to help heal the community and provide a new sense of security for those occupying the space. Major biophilic design elements that Svigals + Partners included in this project are animal feeders, wetlands, courtyards, natural shapes and patterns, natural materials, transitional spaces, images of nature, natural colors, and use of natural light. The school has incorporated a victory garden that is meant to act as a way of healing for children after the tragedy. The architects wanted the children to feel as if they are learning in the trees so they set the school back at the edge of the woods and surrounded the space with large windows; there are also metaphoric metal trees in the lobby that have reflective metal leaves that refract light onto colored glass. Using Kellert's biophilic framework, the school utilizes many different nature experiences. The use of wood planks and stone on the outside of the building help enforce indirect experiences of nature because these are natural materials. Further, the interior environment of the school experiences information richness through the architects' use of light reflection and color. Naturalistic shapes are brought into the interior environment through the metal trees and leaves. For experiences of space and place, Svigals + Partners bring nature into the classroom and school through the placement of windows that act as transitional spaces. The school also has a variety of breezeways, bridges, and pathways for students as they move from one space to another. Direct experiences of nature are enjoyed through water features, large rain gardens, and courtyards found on the property. The animal feeders also act as a way to bring fauna into the area.

=== Jewel Changi Airport ===
Jewel Changi Airport is a ten story, multi-use complex and tourism hotspot connected to Changi Airport in Singapore. It is designed with a multitude of indoor gardens and nature themed design features, including the Rain Vortex, the world's tallest indoor waterfall.

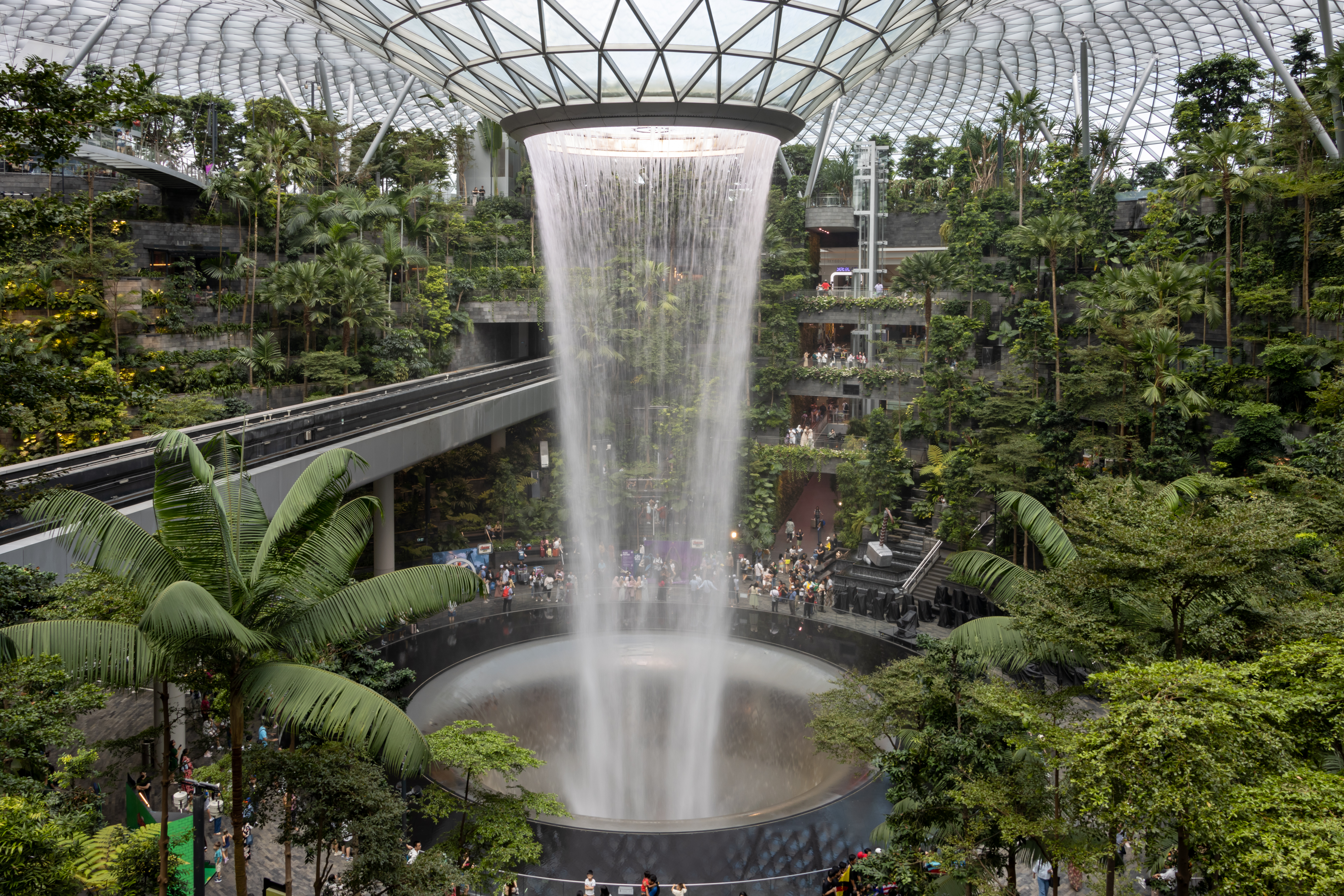
The Rain Vortex at the center of Jewel Changi Airport

== City-scale examples of application ==
=== Singapore, Singapore ===
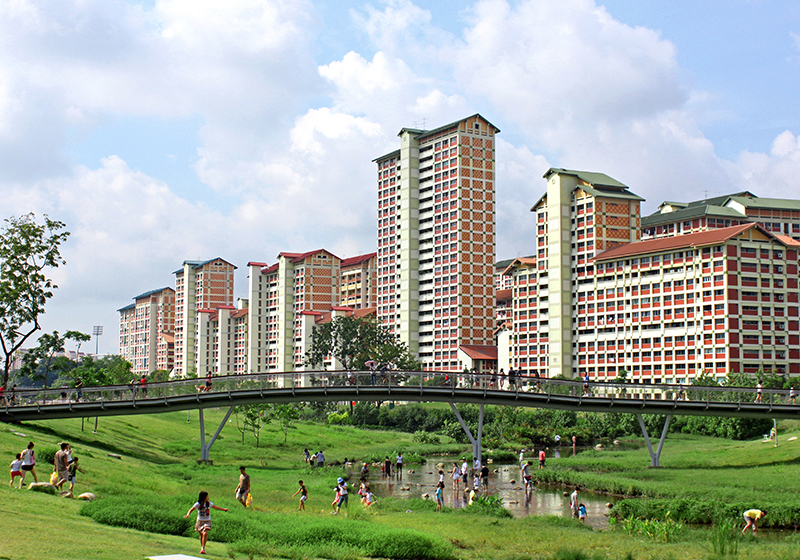
Bishan-Ang Mo Kio Park, Singapore

Nicknamed a "city in a garden", Singapore has dedicated many resources to make a system of nature preserves, parks and connectors (ex. Southern Ridges), and tree-lined streets that promote the return of wildlife and reduce the heat island effect that is often seen in dense city centers; local governments agree with Kellert and Beatley that daily doses of nature enhance the wellbeing of its citizens. To manage stormwater, Singaporean governments have implemented the Bishan-Ang Mo Kio Park Project, where the old concrete water drains were excavated for the reconstruction of the Kallang River; this allowed residents in the area to enjoy the physiological and physical health benefits of having a green space with water. The reimagining of the park has increased the biodiversity of the local ecosystem, with dragonflies, butterflies, hornbills, and smooth-coated otters returning to the Singaporean region - the river also acts as a natural stormwater management system by increasing infiltration and movement of excess water.

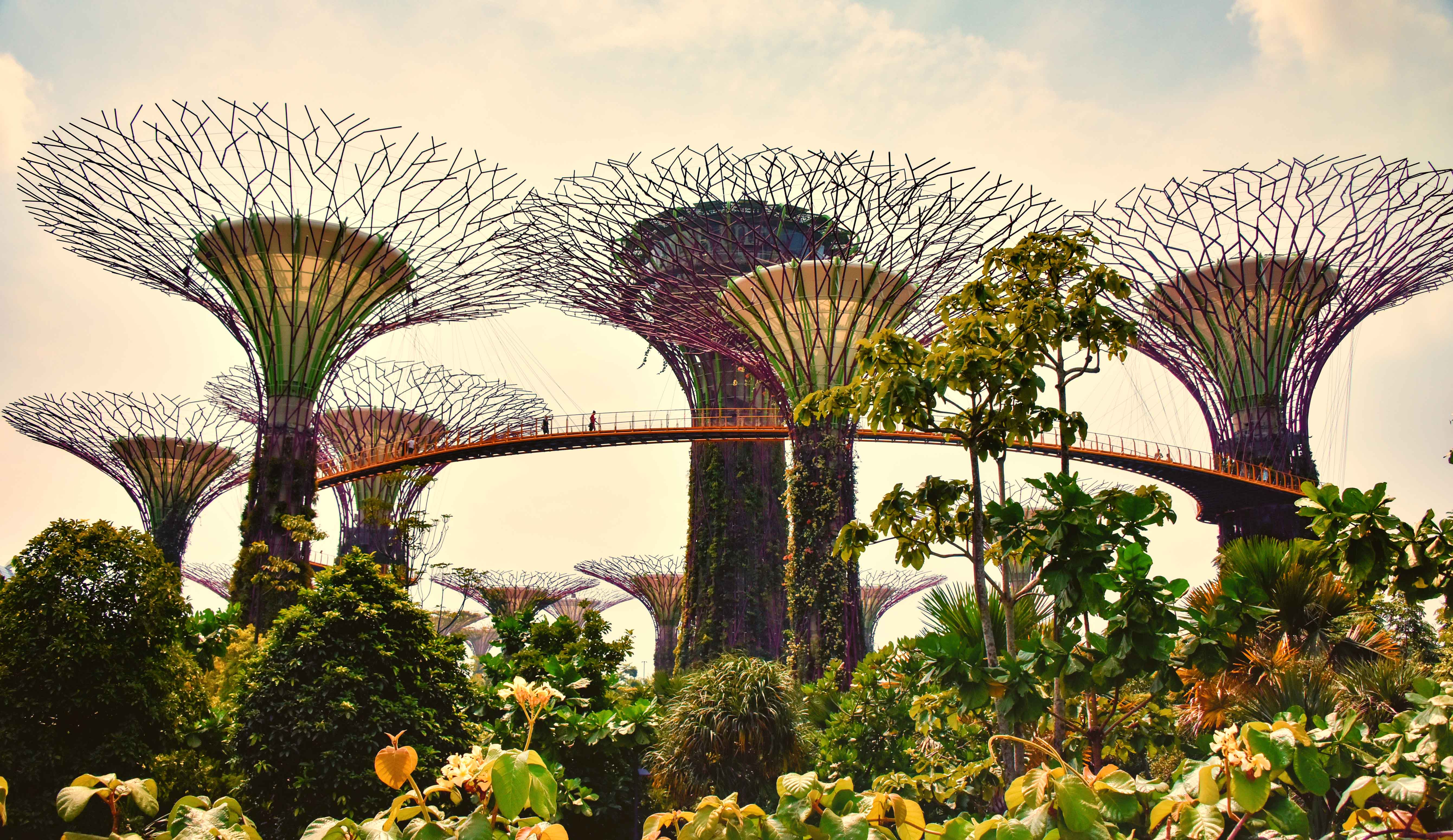
Supertree Grove, Singapore

To increase the immediate presence of nature in the city, Singapore provides subsidies (up to half the installation cost) for those who include vegetative walls, green roofs, sky parks, etc. in their building designs. The city-state also has an impressive number of biophilic buildings and structures. For example, their Gardens by the Bay Project has an installation called the "Supertree Grove". This urban nature installation has over 160,000 plants that stem from 200 different species installed in the 16 supertrees; many of these urban trees have sky walkways, observatories, and or solar panels. Lastly, Singapore has implemented efforts to increase community engagement through the creation of over 1,000 community gardens for resident use.

=== Oslo, Norway ===
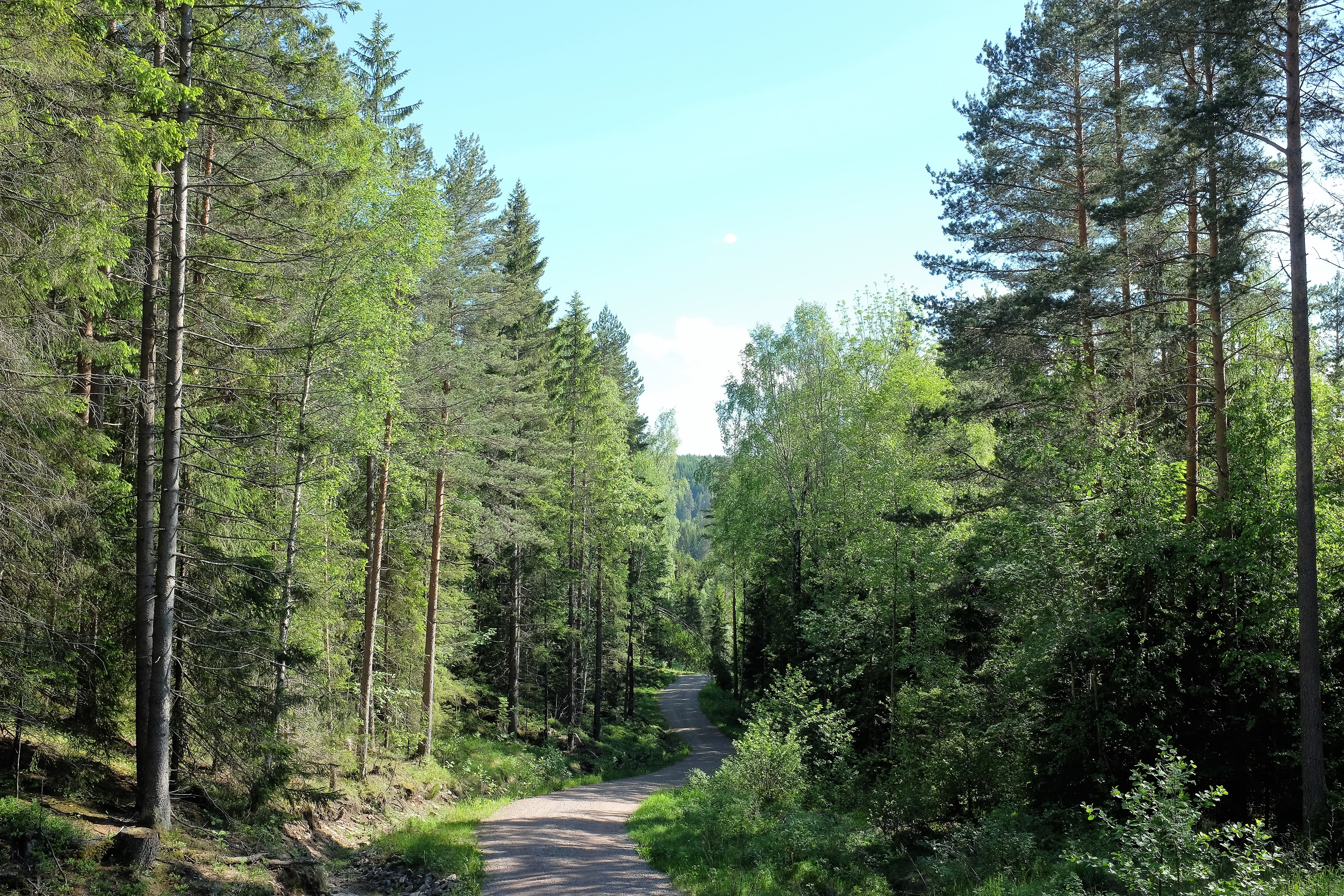
Nature trail in the Maridalen Protected Landscape, Oslo

Oslo is sandwiched between the Oslo Fjord and wooded areas. Woods serve as an important feature to this municipality. More than two-thirds of the city is protected forests; in recent surveys over 81% of Oslo residents said they have gone to these forests at least once in the last year. These forests are protected, as Oslo adheres to ISO14001 for its forest management – the trees are controlled under "living forest" standards, which means that limited harvesting is acceptable. In addition to its extensive forest system, the city compounds its exposure to nature by bringing the natural environment into the urban setting. Being an already compact city (after all, two-thirds is forest) the city allocates around 20% of its urban land to green spaces; the local government is in the process of creating a network of paths to connect these green areas so that citizens can walk and ride their bikes undisturbed. In addition to the expanding park accessibility, the city has also restored the city's river the Akerselva, which runs through Oslo's center. Because the water feature is near sets of dense housing, the city made the river more appealing and accessible to residents by adding waterfalls and nature trails; altogether the city has 365 km worth of nature trails.

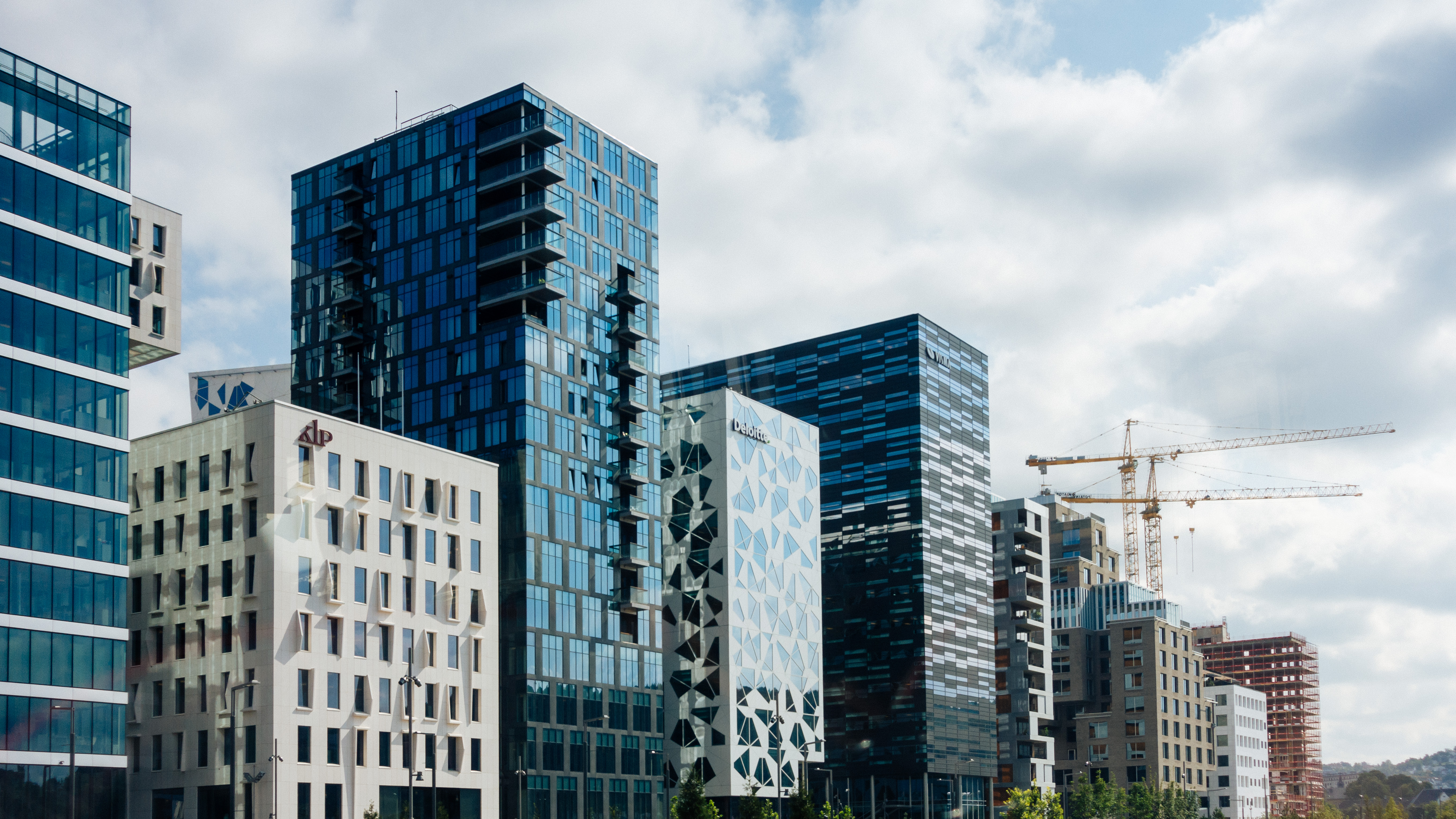
Buildings included in Oslo's Barcode Building Project

To connect the city with its fjords, Oslo's government has started the process of putting its roadways underground in tunnels. This, combined with the construction of aesthetically creative architecture (Barcode Project) on the waterfront and promenade foot trails, is transforming this area into a place where residents can experience enjoyment from the unobstructed views of the fjord. Lastly, Oslo has a Noise Action Plan to help alleviate urban noise levels – some of these areas (mostly recreational) have noise levels as low as 50 dB.

== See also ==
- Biomimetic architecture
- Building-integrated agriculture
- Ecological design
- Folkewall
- Green architecture
- Green building and wood
- Green building
- Green roof
- Greening
- Log house
- Natural building
- Roof garden
- Sustainable city
- Technobiophilia
