= Sue Thomas (author) =

English author

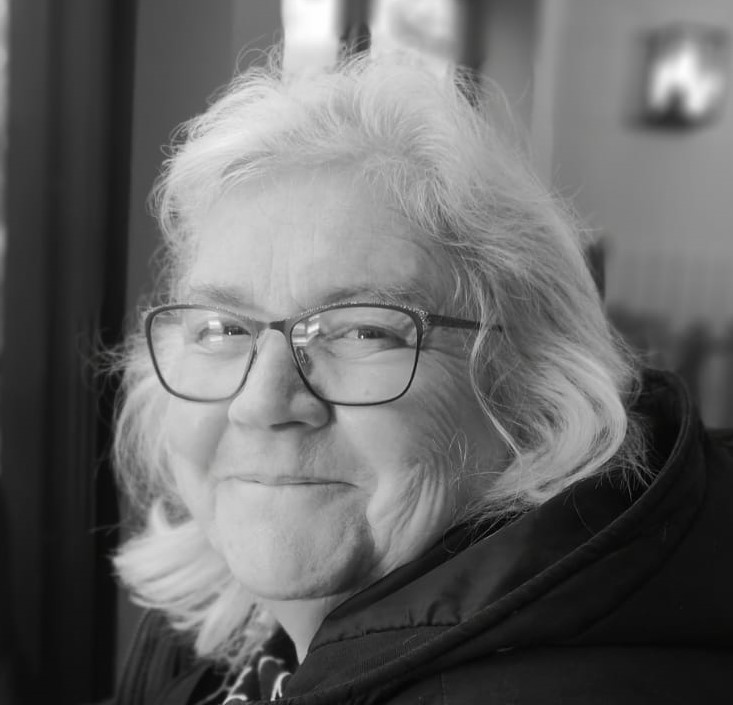
- Sue Thomas in 2021
- Born: 1951 (age 74–75); Leicestershire, England
- Occupation: Writer
- Website: http://www.suethomas.net

Sue Thomas (born 1951) is an English author. Writing since the late 1980s, she has used both fiction and nonfiction to explore the impact of computers and the internet on everyday life. In recent years her work has focused on the connections between life, nature and technology.

== Biography ==
Sue Thomas was born in Rearsby, a small village in Leicestershire, England, where her maternal grandparents owned a rose-growing business. Her parents were both Dutch: her mother, Dora had been brought to the UK as a small child, whilst her father, Wim, grew up in The Netherlands and emigrated to England to marry her mother in 1950.

The three children. Susan, Stephen and Carolyn, were often culturally adrift, caught between two different nationalities – their Dutch heritage and English homeland. Their parents made little attempt to teach them the language but they heard Dutch spoken around them all the time. Sue once wrote that she grew up ‘feeling like a foreigner in my own family’.

During the 1950s and the 1960s, their father had a series of jobs, selling office furniture, photocopiers, articulated lorries and, once, a revolutionary chicken feed system. This meant that the de Vos family frequently moved houses and schools – from Leicestershire to Newcastle, then Corby, Epsom, and finally Nottingham, where Wim at last found his metier as a life underwriter. After five years of disrupted secondary education, Sue left school at 16 and pursued her own equally varied career as accounts clerk, life model, fine art student, bookseller, and self-taught machine-knitter. She married Tyrone Thomas in 1974, had two daughters, Amber b.1976) and Erin (b.1979), and divorced in 1984. In 1985, she enrolled as a mature student to study for a BA Hons in English and History.

After graduation, she spent several years working freelance and teaching creative writing in a wide range of communities from schools and libraries to a high security prison, eventually joining Nottingham Trent University as an English lecturer. Her first novel, ‘Correspondence’, was published in 1992.

Her most recent book is Nature and Wellbeing in the Digital Age. Her previous book, Technobiophilia: nature and cyberspace came out in 2013. The non-fiction travelogue of cyberspace Hello World: travels in virtuality was published in 2004. Her first novel Correspondence was short-listed for the James Tiptree, Jr. Award and the European Science Fiction Award in 1992 and the Arthur C Clarke Award for Best Science Fiction Novel in 1993. She has published extensively in both print and online, and has initiated numerous online writing projects.

== Career ==
In 1988, aged 37, she graduated from Nottingham Trent University and began writing her first novel, Correspondence. As it progressed, she pursued a freelance life, teaching creative writing in numerous different settings including her former university where she set up an MA in Writing which opened in 1994. In 1995 She founded the trAce Online Writing Centre, an early global online community based at Nottingham Trent University. From 1995 to 2005, trAce hosted conferences, online forums, online writing courses, and 34 works of electronic literature in 6 issues of its journal, frAme. which is now restored at the Washington State University's NeXt Museum.

In 1997, she was awarded a substantial Arts Council Grant to set up the trAce Online Writing Community, a ground-breaking internet organisation connecting writers around the world. In 2003 she spent a month at the University of California Los Angeles researching new media writing practices for trAce. The organisation ran for ten years, funded by numerous supporters including East Midlands Arts, The British Council, NESTA, the Royal Literary Fund, and many others. Marjorie Luesebrink reviewed trAce in #WomenTechLit as a landmark innovation. "It was . . . the instantiation of a new kind of international artist's haven, that rendered trAce one of the most influential creative communities and made it so valuable to its members. Dene Grigar resurrected trAce works in the Electronic Literature Organization's NEXT museum.

In 2005 she moved to De Montfort University to take up the position of Professor of New Media in the newly-formed Institute of Creative Technologies (IOCT). Whilst there she worked with Kate Pullinger to set up the MA in Creative Writing and New Media, a 90% online course with an international cohort of students. She also led the development of the concept of transliteracy, "the ability to read, write and interact across a range of platforms, tools and media from signing and orality through handwriting, print, TV, radio and film, to digital social networks". Transliteracy continues to attract much interest among academics and librarians, especially in the United States, France, and Australia. The same year she was awarded a PhD by Publication from Nottingham Trent University: 'A Journey of Integration: virtuality and physicality in a computer-mediated environment'.

In 2009 she was awarded a British Academy grant to spend several months at the University of California Santa Barbara where she undertook the research into the connections between nature and cyberspace which would lead to the development of her theory of technobiophilia.

In 2010 she received funding from NESTA for Amplified Leicester, a city-wide experiment designed to grow the innovation capacity of Leicester by networking key connectors across the city's disparate and diverse communities in an incentivised participatory project enabled by social media.

In 2013, she coined the term technobiophilia which she defined as 'the innate tendency to focus on life and lifelike processes as they appear in technology'. It is extrapolated from the notion of a biophilia hypothesis. In July of the same year she left De Montfort University to become a freelance writer and moved to live by the sea in Dorset, where she accepted an invitation to join Bournemouth University as visiting fellow.

== Books ==
- Nature and Wellbeing in the Digital Age (2017) (nonfiction) ISBN 978-1548291143 (a practical guide to living well with nature and technology)
- Technobiophilia: nature and cyberspace Bloomsbury (2013) (nonfiction) ISBN 978-1849660396 (a study of the biophilic relationship between nature and technology)
- Hello World: Travels in Virtuality Raw Nerve (2004) (travel / autobiography) (a travelogue/memoir of life online)
- Creative Writing: A Handbook For Workshop Leaders University of Nottingham Press (1995) (nonfiction)
- Wild Women: Contemporary Short Stories By Women Celebrating Women (1994) (fiction anthology)
- Water, Tusk/Overlook Press (USA) Five Leaves Press (UK)(1994) (novel)
- Correspondence, The Women's Press (UK) Tusk/Overlook Press (USA)(1992) (novel). Short-listed for the Arthur C. Clarke Award for Best Science Fiction Novel 1993. /

== Chapters ==
- Flickering into Life in '25 Years of the Creative Writing MA at NTU' Shoestring Press, 2019
- Women making new media at the trAce Online Writing Community 1995–2005 in '#WomenTechLit' ed. Maria Mencia, West Virginia University Press, 2017
- Storying cyberspace: narratives of the natural world online in 'Real Lives, Real Stories' Eds Round, J. and Thomas, B. New York: Bloomsbury Academic, 2014
- Making a space: transliteracy and creativity in ’Transdisciplinary Learning for Digital Creative Practice’, Digital Creativity 24:3. September 2013.
- And inside… silence In the Flesh, eds. Page, K. and Leuvens, L. Brindle and Glass: Canada 2012
- From gunny sacks to hyperlinks: notes on early connections between computers, landscapes, and the body in Putting Knowledge to Work and Letting Information Play, Hunsinger, J. & Luke, T.W. (Ed) Tenth Anniversary Research E-Edition, 2009, Center for Digital Discourse and Culture, Virginia Tech. ISBN 978-1-933217-00-0
- Transliteracy and New Media Transdisciplinary Digital Art. Sound, Vision and the New Screen Digital Art Weeks and Interactive Futures 2006/2007, Zurich, Switzerland and Victoria, BC, Canada. Selected Papers Communications in Computer And Information Science Volume 7, 2008, doi:10.1007/978-3-540-79486-8 Adams, Randy; Gibson, Steve; Müller Arisona, Stefan (Eds.) pp 101–109
- Transliteracy as a Unifying Perspective in The Handbook of Research on Social Software and Developing Community Ontologies, Thomas, S., Joseph, C., Laccetti, J., Mason, B., Perril, S., and Pullinger, K. eds. Hatzipanagos. S. and Warburton, S. London: IGI Global ISBN 978-1-60566-208-4 2008
- Correspondence in Reload: Rethinking Women and Cyberculture, ed. by Mary Flanagan & Austin Booth (Cambridge, Massachusetts & London, England: MIT Press 2002) pp. 195–208.
- The Talent For Virtuality in Crossing The Border ed. Lisa Tuttle, (London: Gollancz 1998) (Munich: German translation Der heimliche Spiegel, dtv 2000)
- All Strapped In in 47 Modern European Short Stories, (Copenhagen: Forlaget Systime, 1999) [German; Danish; Finnish]
- All Strapped In in Wild Women: Contemporary Short Stories By Women Celebrating Women, ed. S. Thomas, (New York: Overlook Press 1994; London: Vintage, 1994)
- Between the Boys and their Toys in Where No Man Has Gone Before ed. Lucie Armitt, (London: Routledge 1990)
