= Biophilia =

Biophilia may refer to:

- Biophilia hypothesis, the suggestion that humans possess an innate tendency to seek connections with nature and other forms of life
- Biophilia, a 1984 book by E. O. Wilson presenting the above hypothesis
- Biophilia (album), a 2011 album by Björk
