= Peter Newman (environmental scientist) =

Australian ecologist

Professor Peter Newman AO
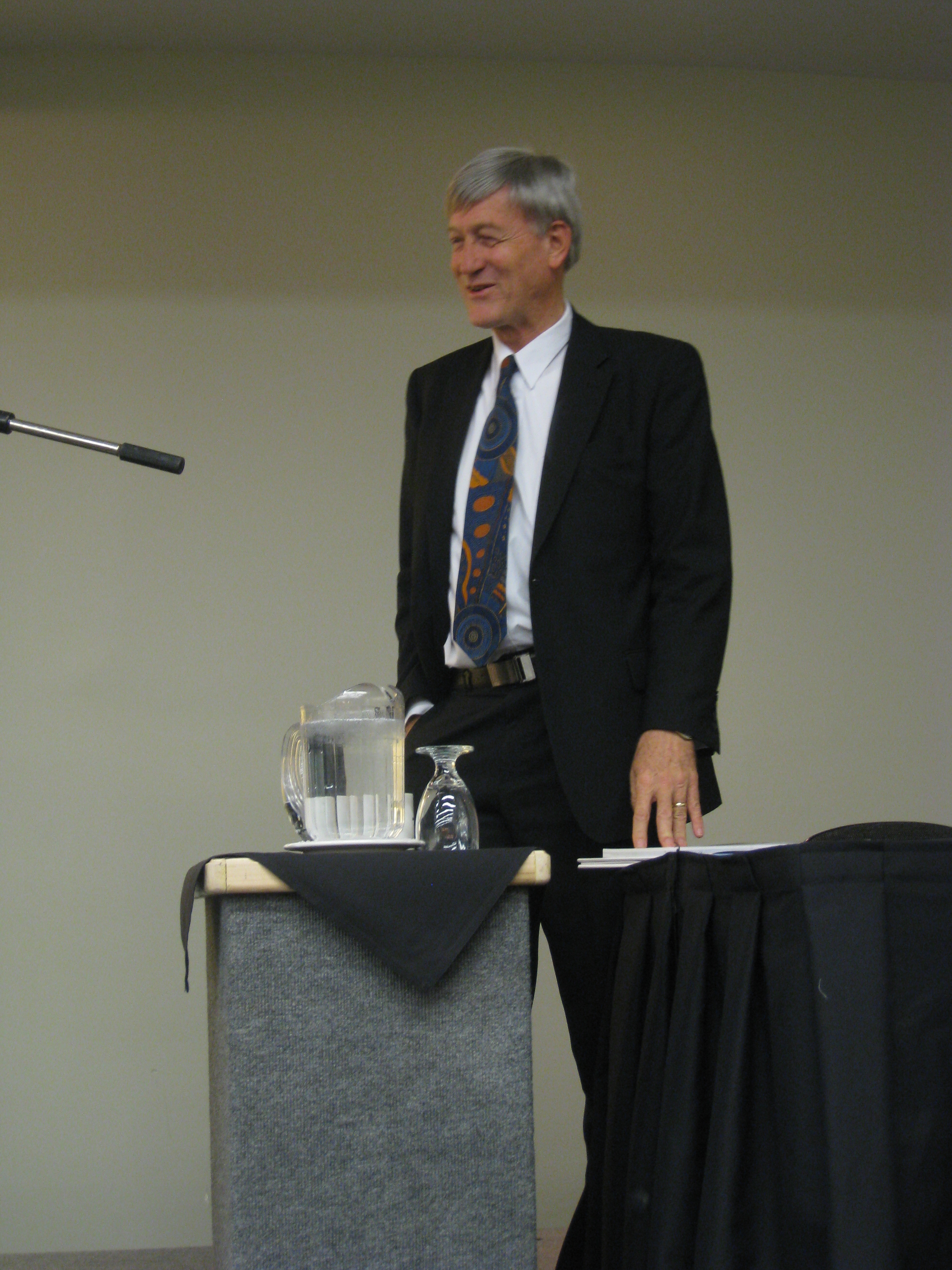
- Born: Peter William Geoffrey Newman; 1945 (age 80–81)
- Education: University of Western Australia; Delft University
- Occupation: Professor of Sustainability
- Employer: Curtin University
- Known for: Sustainability, transport, urban policy
- Website: Official website

Peter William Geoffrey Newman AO (born 1945) is an environmental scientist, author and educator based in Perth, Western Australia. He is currently Professor of Sustainability at Curtin University. He is best known for his contributions to the development of Perth's electrified metropolitan rail network through both activist and official consulting roles since the 1980s.

Newman has written 26 books and over 440 papers on sustainable cities and is most known for creating the term "automobile dependence" in the second half of the 1980s. He was closely associated with community opposition to the closure of the Fremantle Railway in 1979 and subsequent redevelopment of the metropolitan rail system from 1983 to the present. He was a lead author for transport on the Intergovernmental Panel on Climate Change.

He has a PhD degree in chemistry (1972, University of Western Australia) and completed post doctoral studies in Environmental Science, Delft University, Dip EST, Environmental Science, 1972.

== Career and influence ==
Newman is best known internationally for popularizing the term ‘automobile dependence’ in the second half of the 1980s to explain how the cities based on sprawling suburbs were inevitably leading to the growth in automobile use. He led an international research project with colleague Jeff Kenworthy on transport practices and structures (original data collected on 33 global cities). The results were published in Cities and Automobile Dependence: An International Sourcebook, which introduced the concept of car dependence – now a feature of planning literature and policy. The two researchers later collaborated on the book Sustainability and Cities: Overcoming Automobile Dependence which was launched in the White House in 1999, as the President's Council on Sustainable Development was moving toward a more urban focus, and more recently The End of Automobile Dependence: How Cities are Moving Beyond Car-based Planning.

In Cities as Sustainable Ecosystems: Principles and Practices written with Isabella Jennings, Newman shows how city residents can begin to reintegrate into their bioregional environment, and how cities themselves can be planned with ecological sustainability in mind. Drawing on examples from many parts of the world, the authors show how urban redevelopment in some cities has involved harvesting rainwater, greening roofs, and producing renewable energy. Other cities have biodiversity parks for endangered species, community gardens that support a connection to their foodshed, and pedestrian-friendly spaces that encourage walking and cycling.

=== Local, state and federal government ===
Between 1976 and 1980 Newman served as a local government councillor in the City of Fremantle. Newman has been a government advisor through three secondments to the Western Australian State Government. In the last secondment (2001–03), he was the Director of Sustainability Policy in the Department of Premier and Cabinet where he managed and wrote the State Sustainability Strategy: the first in the world at the state/province level. In 2004–2005 he was the New South Wales Sustainability Commissioner.

Between 2008 and 2014 he was a member of Infrastructure Australia.

=== Academia ===
From 1989 to 2007 Newman was Director of the Institute for Sustainability and Technology Policy, Murdoch University in Murdoch, Western Australia. In 2007, Newman left Murdoch University to join Curtin University as Director of Curtin University Sustainability Policy Institute. In 2006–07 he was a Fulbright Scholar at the University of Virginia, Charlottesville.

=== International advisor ===
Peter Newman was an author for the Intergovernmental Panel on Climate Change for the AR5 Mitigation Report in 2014, the Special Report on 1.5 Degrees in 2018, and the AR6 Mitigation Report in 2022 where he was a Co-ordinating Lead Author for Transport.

== Honors and recognition ==
- Murdoch University 25th Anniversary Special Service Medallion. (2000)
- Centenary Medal by the Australian Government in 2001 for Planning and Sustainability.
- Fellow, Australian Academy of Technological Sciences and Engineering, from 2009.
- Fellow, Planning Institute of Australia, from 2018.
- Officer of the Order of Australia in 2014 for services to sustainable transport and urban design.
- Western Australian Scientist of the Year, 2018/19.
- Part of the Race to 2023 Pathway to Net Zero Precincts project.

== Publications ==
- 1989 Cities and Automobile Dependence: An International Sourcebook, Newman P and Kenworthy J, Gower, Aldershot.
- 1992 Winning Back the Cities, Pluto Press, Sydney, Newman P and Kenworthy J.
- 1999 Sustainability and Cities: Overcoming Automobile Dependence, Island Press, Washington DC. Newman P and Kenworthy J, ISBN 1-55963-660-2.
- 1999 An International Sourcebook of Automobile Dependence in Cities, 1960–1990, Kenworthy J, Laube F and Newman P, University of Colorado Press, Boulder, 1999.
- 2001 Back on Track: Rethinking Australia and New Zealand Transport Policy, Laird P, Newman P, Kenworthy J and Bachels M, UNSW Press, Sydney, 2001.
- 2003 Hope for the Future: The Western Australian State Sustainability Strategy, Department of the Premier and Cabinet, WA Government, Perth, 2003.
- 2008 Cities as Sustainable Ecosystems: Principles and Practices with Isabella Jennings, Washington, DC: Island Press, ISBN 978-1-59726-187-6.
- 2008 Green Urbanism Down Under: Learning from Sustainable Communities in Australia with Timothy Beatley, Island Press, ISBN 1597264113
- 2009 Resilient Cities with Timothy Beatley and Heather Boyer, Island Press, ISBN 978-1-59726-499-0
- 2013 Green Urbanism in Asia with Anne Matan, World Scientific Publishing.
- 2015 The End of Automobile Dependence, with Kenworthy J, Island Press.
- 2016 'People Cities: The Life and Legacy of Jan Gehl', with Annie Matan, Island Press.
- 2017 'Resilient Cities: Overcoming fossil fuel dependence' with Timothy Beatley and Heather Boyer, Island Press.
- 2017 'Never Again: Reflections on Environmental Responsibility after Roe 8', with Andrea Gaynor and Phil Jennings, UWA Scholar Press, Perth. https://uwap.uwa.edu.au/products/never-again-reflections-on-environmental-responsibility-after-roe-8
- 2020 'Planetary Accounting', with Kate Meyer, Springer Hardcover ISBN 978-981-15-1442-5
- 2022 'Greening the Greyfields: New Models for Regenerating the Middle Suburbs of Low-Density Cities', with Peter Newton, Steve Glackin and Giles Thomson, Palgrave MacMillan, Melbourne. https://library.oapen.org/bitstream/handle/20.500.12657/51917/978-981-16-6238-6.pdf?sequence=1
- 2023 'Revising Smart Cities with Regenerative Design', with Zaheer Allam, Springer Hardcover ISBN 978-3-031-28027-6.
- 2025 'Net Zero Cities with Sustainability: A Practitioners Approach', Edward Elgar, London. https://www.e-elgar.com/shop/gbp/net-zero-cities-with-sustainability-9781800379053.html
