= Technobiophilia =

Innate tendency to focus on life and lifelike processes as they appear in technology

Technobiophilia is 'the innate tendency to focus on life and lifelike processes as they appear in technology'. The term was coined by Sue Thomas in 2013 as an analysis of the Biophilia hypothesis introduced by the biologist Edward O. Wilson in his book Biophilia (1984).

Wilson defines biophilia as "the innate tendency to focus on life and lifelike processes." Technobiophilia in practice may connect human life and digital processes with nature, contribute to well-being via a tech-nature balance, and support future biodiversity as technology and nature move closer together.

Timothy Beatley, Teresa Heinz Professor of Sustainable Communities in the Department of Urban and Environmental Planning at the University of Virginia School of Architecture, wrote in 2015, "We can look forward to the promise and potential of technophilic cities, that at once commit to restoring and enjoying actual nature, but acknowledge the realities of life in cities (much of it inside, and behind a screen), and the powerful ways in which our digital technologies could underpin and help to reinforce our nature-ful commitments and experiences and our biophilic tendencies."

Many supporters of technobiophilia consider advances in technology as opportunities for seeking intimacy with nature.

== See also ==
- Nature therapy
- Red light therapy
