= Green urbanism =

Practice of creating communities beneficial to humans and the environment

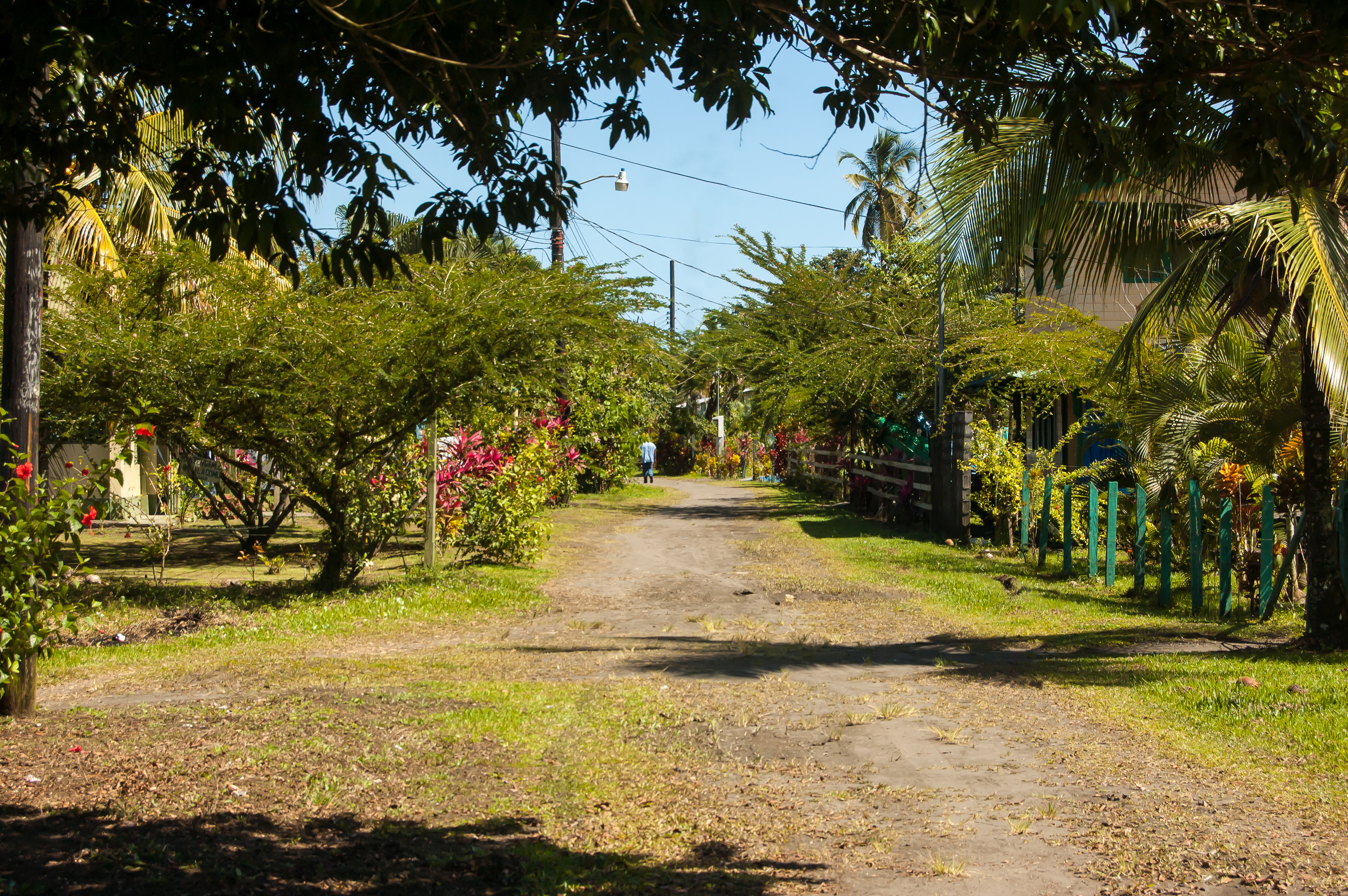
Parismina

Green urbanism has been defined as the practice of creating communities beneficial to both humans and the environment. According to Timothy Beatley, it is an attempt to shape more sustainable places, communities and lifestyles, and consume less of the world's resources. Urban areas are able to lay the groundwork of how environmentally integrated and sustainable city planning can both provide and improve environmental benefits on the local, national, and international levels. Green urbanism is interdisciplinary, combining the collaboration of landscape architects, engineers, urban planners, ecologists, transport planners, physicists, psychologists, sociologists, economists and other specialists in addition to architects and urban designers.

== Urbanization and environmental degradation ==
Urbanization and environmental consequences have always moved hand in hand. In 1989, American ecologist H.T. Odum called cities ‘parasites’ living off the resources of natural and domesticated environments; a city makes no food, cleans no air and cleans only a small amount of water for reuse it only consumes. Mayur (1990) argued that such disharmony may result in environmentally catastrophic events (cited in Leitmann, 1999). Leitmann mentioned such critical urban environmental problems as the ‘brown agenda’ which deals with both environmental health and industrialization. He further pointed out that throughout the 19th century; developing countries were more concerned of the public health impacts of poor sanitation and pollution. Moreover, he figured out the links between cities and ecosystems into three phases. Early Urbanization phase, starting from 3000 BCE to 1800 CE, was of more productive agricultural techniques yielding a surplus that was able to support non-agricultural concentrations of people. In second phase, Urban Industrialization (1800 CE - 1950 CE), energy consumption, particularly fossil fuels, was increased rapidly with mechanization of production. Since the 1950s the city/environment relationship has entered into third phase, Global interdependence, with rapid population growth and globalization of economy. Cities became the nodal points for large and globally interconnected flows of resources, wastes, and labor. Also, environmental problems are local, regional and global in scale, with cities increasingly contributing to global environmental damage.

Since the 1960s, the number of people living within towns and cities has grown exponentially. According to the United Nations, 2009 is the year that the number of people living in urban areas surpassed those in rural areas. With the current urbanized growth rate, it is projected that by 2050, the global population living in urban areas will be at 68% or slightly over 6.5 billion, with a global population of 9.7 billion. With such a large population making the change to live in an urban area, it is vital to the health of cities to be able to provide enough resources and energy to the population by the means of environmentally sustainable resources. Meeting the growing production and consumption needs of urban populations causes an immense amount of strain on the surround suburban and rural communities. Nearby ecosystems can easily become compromised due to the physical expansion of urban areas.

Rydin (2010) accused the cities as both villains and victims of climate change pattern. Climate change affecting urban sustainability in regards to temperature increase which may exacerbate urban heat island (UHI) effect and rainfall patterns (Rydin, 2010). Some other cities may also go through environmental catastrophes, like cyclone and storm, coastal erosion, sea-level rise, ground instability and changes in biodiversity. The whole scenario called for an urgent need to focus on rebuilding the urban ecosystem with given emphasis on the human settlements.

== History ==
A glimpse on the history of green urbanism of the U.S. as found in Karlenzig's, et al. ‘How Green is Your City’ book (2007, 06–07). The concept had a gradual start in the late 1800s, when some large cities of the United States (U.S.) started using advanced drinking water, sewage and sanitary systems. Consecutively, public parks and open spaces were implemented in New York City. At the end of the World War II, the US government offered its citizens affordable housing through easy loans to boost up the city population and also introduced a new federal Interstate System; combined with a rise of automobile ownership, this gave way to a novel way of life called ‘Suburbia’. Meanwhile, in the 1950s, the inhabitants of other industrial cities, including Chicago, Detroit, St. Louis, Cleveland and Philadelphia, had already experienced greener suburban pastures. But all those green trees died because of old age or pollution, and were not replaced. The first book describing the comprehensive rebuilding of cities toward balance with nature is "Los Angeles: a History of the Future" (1982) by Paul Glover (activist). After a decade of the ‘Urban Renaissance’, the term used by Richard Rogers, came into light in 1990. Europe was never far behind to endorse urban sustainability. ‘The Green Paper on the Urban Development’ published in 1990 has been considered as a ‘milestone’ document in promoting sustainable city projects as a solution to global environmental role (Beatley, 2000). Lehmann (2010) mentioned that since then, cities have engaged themselves in a global-scale competition with each other in three distinct areas. Firstly, to be regarded as an attractive, creative place and a cultural hub to attract highly skilled workers and Melbourne, Australia was strong competition with arts, museum and university; secondly, to get recognition as a place for secure investment, mention worthy, Dubai, Shanghai, and Singapore have topped in attracting and facilitating global investment capital; and thirdly, to become a leader of green vision by technological advancement and offering environmentally sound lifestyles and also providing green jobs; Hannover and Copenhagen have done well in this field.

After the Earth Summit in 1992, different terms, including, sustaining cities, sustainable cities (Beatley, 2000), sustainable urbanism (Farr, 2008), green city (Karlenzig, 2007), eco-towns, eco districts and eco-cities (Lehmann, 2010), have tried to reduce environmental impacts of cities and achieve sustainable development. Thus, to live more peacefully there. Both green and sustainable cities present fundamental opportunities to apply new technologies. For example, public transport, district heating, green buildings, and green design also bring major lifestyle changes such as, walking, bicycling, and reducing energy consumption. The major agenda of the above-mentioned cities are tackling global climate change, biodiversity loss, and also lifting themselves as ‘hosts’ of all environmental challenges.

It has been argued that the focus of these theories are mainly on adjusting the relationship between the city and nature and also creating new cities other than renovating existing cities. To address the gap, Timothy Beatley and Steffen Lehmann used the ‘green urbanism’ theory that aims to transform existing cities from fragmentation to compaction.

== Principles of Green Urbanism ==
The three main contemporary planners who have contributed to Green Urbanism Thought are Steffen Lehmann, Timothy Beatley, and Peter Newman. Each has their own principles that define green urbanism, and what quality an urban space needs to attain to be green urbanist. All of these principles are based on the understanding that urbanization is a key driver of carbon emissions, resource depletion and environmental degradation. These are zero fossil-fuel energy use, zero waste and zero emissions especially aimed for low-to-no-carbon emissions.

=== Lehmann’s 15 Principles of Green Urbanism ===
Lehmann uses a strategic case study of the seaport city of Newcastle, New South Wales, Australia to build his definition of Green Urbanism. According to Lehmann, there are 15 such principles of green urbanism that are practical and holistic, including all the aspects needed to achieve sustainable development and encouraging best practice models (Lehmann, 2010). The principles are as follows:

1. Climate and Context: Based on climatic condition prior to selected city, every sustainable design project needs to maintain a complexity within biodiversity, eco-system or neighborhood layout. Enhance the opportunities offered by topographies and natural settings and use of the buildings’ envelope to filter temperature, humidity, light, wind and noise.
2. Renewable Energy for Zero CO_{2} Emissions: Transform city districts into local power stations of renewable energy sources including solar PV, solar thermal, wind on-and-off-shore, biomass, geothermal power, mini-hydro energy and other new technologies. Some most promising technologies are in building-integrated PV, urban wind turbines, micro CHP and solar cooling.
3. Zero Waste City: Waste prevention is better than the treatment or cleaning-up after waste is formed. So cities should adopt zero-waste urban planning in line with the manufacturing of metals, glass, plastics, paper into new products and better understanding of nutrient flows is needed to control global nitrogen cycle.
4. Water:Cities can be used as a water catchment area by educating the inhabitants in water efficiency, promoting rainwater collection and using waste water recycling and storm water harvesting techniques. In terms of food yielding level, less water needed and drought resistant crops can be developed.
5. Landscape, Gardens and Biodiversity:Introduce inner-city gardens, urban farming/agriculture and green roofs to maximise the resilience of the eco-system through urban landscape thus to mitigate UHI effect. Plants can be used for air-purification and narrowing of roads for urban cooling. Moreover, preserving green space, gardens and farmland, maintaining a green belt around the city is necessity to absorb CO_{2}.
6. Sustainable transport and good public space. Compact and poly-centric cities: An integration of non-motorised transport, such as, cycling or walking and bi-cycle or pedestrian-friendly environment with safe bicycle ways, eco-mobility concepts and smart infrastructure that is electric vehicles, integrated transport system of bus transit, railway and bike stations, improved public space networks and connectivity and a focus on transport-oriented development (Green TODs).
7. Local and sustainable materials with less embodied energy: City construction by using regional, local materials with less embodied energy and applying pre-fabricated modular systems.
8. Density and retrofitting of existing districts: The city is with retrofitted districts, urban infill, and densification/intensification strategies for existing neighbourhoods.
9. Green buildings and districts, using passive design principles: The city, here, applies deep green building design strategies and offers solar access for all new buildings.
10. Liveability, Healthy Communities and Mixed-Use Programmes: The prime concern of the city is for affordable housing, mixed-use programmes and a healthy community.
11. Local food and short supply chains: High food security and urban agriculture by introducing ‘eat local’ and ‘slow food’ initiatives.
12. Cultural heritage, identity and sense of place: A sustainable city with high air quality, no pollution for good health, fosters resilient communities having public space networks and modern community facilities.
13. Urban governance, leadership and best practices: The city applies best practice for good urban governance through combined management and governance approaches and sustainable procurement methods, such as, environmental budgeting.
14. Education, research and knowledge: The city with education includes technical training and up-skilling, research, exchange of experiences and knowledge dissemination for all in sustainable urban development.
15. Strategies for cities in developing countries: Particular sustainability strategies are needed for cities in developing countries, such as, train local people to empower communities, creating new jobs and diversifying new job structures to harmonize the impacts of rapid urbanisation and globalisation.

=== Beatley's Vision of Green Urbanism ===
Beatley remarked that the vision of green urbanism includes programs, policies and creative design ideas for urban renewal and environment sustainability. Lehmann added the phrase also provides a proactive vision of what might be our zero-carbon, fossil fuel free future: overlapping mixed-use activities, living and working building typologies explored on the urban scale, infrastructures systems for renewable energies, public transport and individual energy-efficient building designs. According to Beatley, cities that exemplify green urbanism are:

- Cities must be conscious of their ecological effects on surrounding communities and their own natural resources. They must strive to reduce their cannon footprint and waste production.
- Cities should be designed to work with nature to help cleanse the city’s air and water. Green urbanist cities should have plenty of sunlight, and greenspaces (e.g. rooftop gardens and parks).
- Cities should strive to create circular, not linear, waste flow. Breaking away from the current extraction and discard cycle.
- Cities must be self-sufficient by growing food, producing power, and cleaning drinking water.
- Cities should try to be more sustainable by prioritizing walking, biking, and public transit. All of which decreases the carbon emissions of the city.
- Cities should focus on its quality of life by creating livable conditions for all residents. Thus looking at the city from a neighborhood level to provide acceptable housing for all.

=== Newman's Seven Archetypal Cities ===
Peter Newman describes his principles of Green Urbanism through seven archetypal cities that each represent a different aspect of Green Urbanism. Newman believes that Green Urbanism can be used to create a more sustainable society that can fight against the ecological impacts of climate change. He discusses the importance of renewable energy, a circular economy, and sustainable infrastructure. These are Newman's seven Archetypal Cities:

1. The Renewable City: Is a city powered by renewable energy. Urban planning should be utilized to support wind power and solar energy, by creating rooftop solar paneling and off coast wind farms.
2. The Carbon-Neutral City: Is a city that strives to reduce carbon emissions, increase renewable energy, and offset remaining carbon emissions. Cities can decrease their carbon emissions by building energy efficient buildings, increasing the efficiency of public transportation, and lining roads with trees and greenery.
3. The Distributed City: Is a city that spreads energy and water production throughout different areas of the city. Thus decentralizing energy and water systems with smaller systems of production, like rooftop solar panels and water recycling systems.
4. The Biophilic City: Using the principles of Green Infrastructure to bring ecological features and green areas into the city in order to combat carbon emissions. Creating more green space and trees to trap air pollutants and urban agriculture to decrease a city’s carbon footprint.
5. Eco-Efficient City: A city that strives to reduce their carbon footprint by reducing waste and decreasing its consumption. By using a circular economy to create a circular flow of waste, a city can reduce the amount of waste that eventually ends up in landfills or polluting surrounding nature and waterways.
6. Placed-Based City: It is a that prioritizes creating a local economy that is committed to the community, thus creating local jobs that then decrease the amount of carbon emissions used for commuting. The city then priorities localizing production of energy, food, and materials to create a strong place-based city.
7. The Sustainable Transport City: Is a city that creates a sustainable transportation system, by offering walkable transit-options that focus on using renewable energy. The city should strive to create a high-density urban form that makes walking, biking, and public transportation a more efficient option.

== Plans of Action ==
=== Global Platform on Sustainable Cities ===
Cities play an important role in the concept of green urbanism. Many cities succeed in harming the environment versus preserving it. However, numerous cities are already taking action to enhance the sustainability of growing urban populations. Mayors and authorities of larger cities are pushing for greener development projects and governmental services to adhere to. Various organizations are calling for a plan of action to promote cities as natural places that have the capability of generating multiple benefits to the environment. A program had recently been launched that is known as the Global Platform on Sustainable Cities. The platform was created in March, 2016. Within four years, it has grown to comprise 28 cities throughout 11 countries. It is committed to finding various approaches to waste management, environmental conservation, transportation, and energy production and consumption. Urbanized areas have the largest energy consumption and pollute the environment the most.

=== 'Die Energiewende' - The Energy Turnaround in Germany ===
Some countries have quickly become global leaders in green energy during the previous decade. Germany held the title for the nation producing the most solar energy in the world, up until China amped up their green energy production. Germany became one of the first industrialized nations to strive for an energy supply from renewable energy sources. The German society had been looking into green energy since the 1970s, but without much government support. After catastrophes such as Chernobyl and Fukushima, “Die Energiewende,” otherwise known as the energy turnaround became a main political movement within German borders. During the 2010s, Germany saw tremendous leaps in green energy production. From 2012 – 2019, onshore and offshore wind capacity doubled from an installed capacity of 30,979MW to 61,357MW, and solar grew from 34,077MW install capacity to 49,061MW. Much of this has to do with laws and incentives that were passed during the leadership of Angela Merkel, who studied physics and earned her doctorate in quantum chemistry and has been nicknamed as "The Climate Chancellor". Part of the Energiewende goal is to reduce CO_{2} emissions into the atmosphere by 90% by 2050. The advancement of renewable energy technologies and the reduction in costs has greatly helped Germany and other countries improve their renewable energy sectors. Germany has vowed to dismantle all 17 of their nuclear reactors. As of 2019, 6 nuclear reactors remain, with demolition dates set in 2021 and 2022 respectively.

=== Copenhagen - The World's First Carbon-Neutral Capital ===
Copenhagen has vowed to become the world's first carbon-neutral capital by 2025. It's considered an ambitious project, with most capitals planning to become carbon-neutral close to 2050, but Copenhagen is becoming a trailblazer and proving to others how easy it is to go green without going bankrupt. Officials are hoping to set an example to others and show that society also plays a large impact on achieving such goals. Copenhagen is constantly ranked as being the most bike-friendly city in the world. The city is working to offer all-electric public transportation that is constantly moving, encouraging more people to ride a bike or take public transportation instead of driving vehicles. To further shrink the carbon footprint of the city, Copenhagen has installed 62 wind turbines with a capacity to produce upwards of 158 megawatts. The city plans to have a wind turbine energy production capacity of 460 MW by 2025; more than doubling their capacity as of 2019.

=== Singapore - City in a Garden ===
Singapore has shown the world how green urbanism can be achieved in a densely populated city. Singapore is a city state that has an area of 728.6 km2 with a population of 5.6 million making it the 2nd most densely populated country in the world. The city is renowned for its ability to bring nature and greenery to an urban environment. Singapore's current city motto is “Singapore – City in a Garden" which was changed from “Singapore – Garden City" highlighting that the city's first priority is its greenery. The city has an extensive 180 km park system that has paths and walkways interweaving throughout green spaces and gardens around the city. The city has bolstered its green urban structure through its Skyrise Greenery initiative which subsidises the building of roof and vertical gardens. Renewable energy has been growing throughout the city with 203 MWp in 2018 to 350 MWp in 2020, and the city wants to increase its capacity to over 1 GWp. The city also has an exemplary recycling system with almost all of construction waste being recycled, and extracting from the waste stream so very little eventually ends up in landfills. The Majority of rain and storm water is collected and used throughout the city. Singapore also has an esteemed public transit system with most public transit is faster than traffic down main corridors.

== Practical approaches ==
Many cities now have Sustainable Action Plans which is a roadmap towards sustainability. Green Urbanism has grown from textbook methodologies to living action plans that survive beyond the election cycles of city mayors and counsellors.

Green Urbanism poses the demand for an applicable method in planning and management of a city. Wybe Kuitert proposed analyzing the city as a landscape system to reach at a more comprehensive approach towards this end. The urban landscape connects the cultural components, like identity and history with the natural physics of a city, like its geography, water and natural ecology. As such it poses a vision that can be applied to any city, rich or poor. Discerning the potential quality of wild nature in the city is a first step to see what nature can give, if we only have an open eye for it. It is discovered through the potential vegetation map for the city. There is a lot of Conferences talking about this Field as ‘Green Urbanism’ which will be held in Italy from 12 to 14 October 2016.

== See also ==
- Green transport hierarchy
- Green infrastructure
- Land recycling
- Urban vitality
