= Timothy Beatley =

American sustainable city researcher

Dr Timothy Beatley is an internationally recognized sustainable city researcher and author. His writings have focused on creative strategies cities can use to reduce their ecological footprints and become more livable and equitable places in the process. Beatley coined the term green urbanism and uses it frequently in his writings to describe the planning process used to create a sustainable city.

== Academic background ==
Beatley received a PhD in City and Regional Planning from the University of North Carolina at Chapel Hill in 1986. He is currently "Teresa Heinz Professor of Sustainable Communities" in the Department of Urban and Environmental Planning, the University of Virginia School of Architecture.

His primary teaching and research interests are in environmental planning and policy, with special emphasis on coastal and natural hazards planning, environmental values and ethics, and biodiversity conservation. He has been a prolific author since the mid-1980s on the subjects of coastal hazard mitigation, hurricane recovery, habitat and ecosystem conservation, environmental ethics, and sustainable urban planning.

His 2010 book Biophilic Cities: Integrating Nature into Urban Design and Planning advocates putting the biophilia hypothesis into practice with an outline of the essential elements of a biophilic city and examples and stories about cities that have successfully integrated biophilic elements.

== Green urbanism ==
In his recent works surveying sustainable cities in Europe and Australia, Beatley argues that although cities typically consume large quantities of fossil fuels and generate enormous amounts of waste and pollution, they are the most important centers for positive environmental change. Beatley notes that the high population density that characterizes most cities (especially European cities) also means that land is used efficiently, that automobiles are not the primary mode of transportation, and that per capita consumption of resources is low. Beatley's description of a typical sustainable city is one that is compact and walkable with easily accessible parks and green spaces. Such a city also would emphasize sustainable forms of mobility, such as public transportation and bicycles. Parallel to Beatley's studies, the concept of green urbanism has been discussed by Steffen Lehmann in Australia, for instance in his book The Principles of Green Urbanism (Earthscan, London, 2010) and in the journal S.A.P.I.EN.S.

In Beatley's view, a city exemplifies green urbanism if it (1) strives to live within its ecological limits, (2) is designed to function in ways analogous to nature, (3) strives to achieve a circular rather than a linear metabolism, (4) strives toward local and regional self-sufficiency, (5) facilitates more sustainable lifestyles, and (6) emphasizes a high quality of neighborhood and community life. Beatley uses these six points to define Green Urbanism as a different type of New Urbanism, and therefore an ecological movement, although others have interpreted Beatley's definition to be simply an alternative type of urban design.

== Publications ==
- Beatley, Timothy (2014), Blue Urbanism: Exploring Connections Between Cities and Oceans, Island Press.
- Beatley, Timothy (2012), Green urbanism: learning from European cities, Island Press.
- Beatley, Timothy; Newman, Peter (2012), Green Urbanism Down Under: Learning from Sustainable Communities in Australia, Island Press, ISBN 1597264113.
- Beatley, Timothy (2010), Biophilic Cities: Integrating Nature into Urban Design and Planning, Island Press.
- Beatley, Timothy (2004), Native to nowhere: sustaining home and community in a global age, Island Press.
- Beatley, Timothy; Manning, Kristy (1997), The ecology of place: planning for environment, economy, and community, Island Press.
- Beatley, Timothy; Brower, David J.; Schwab, Anna K. (2002) An introduction to coastal zone management, Island Press.
- Beatley, Timothy (1994), Ethical land use: principles of policy and planning, Johns Hopkins University Press.
