= Hilary Cunningham Scharper =

Canadian novelist and professor of cultural anthropology

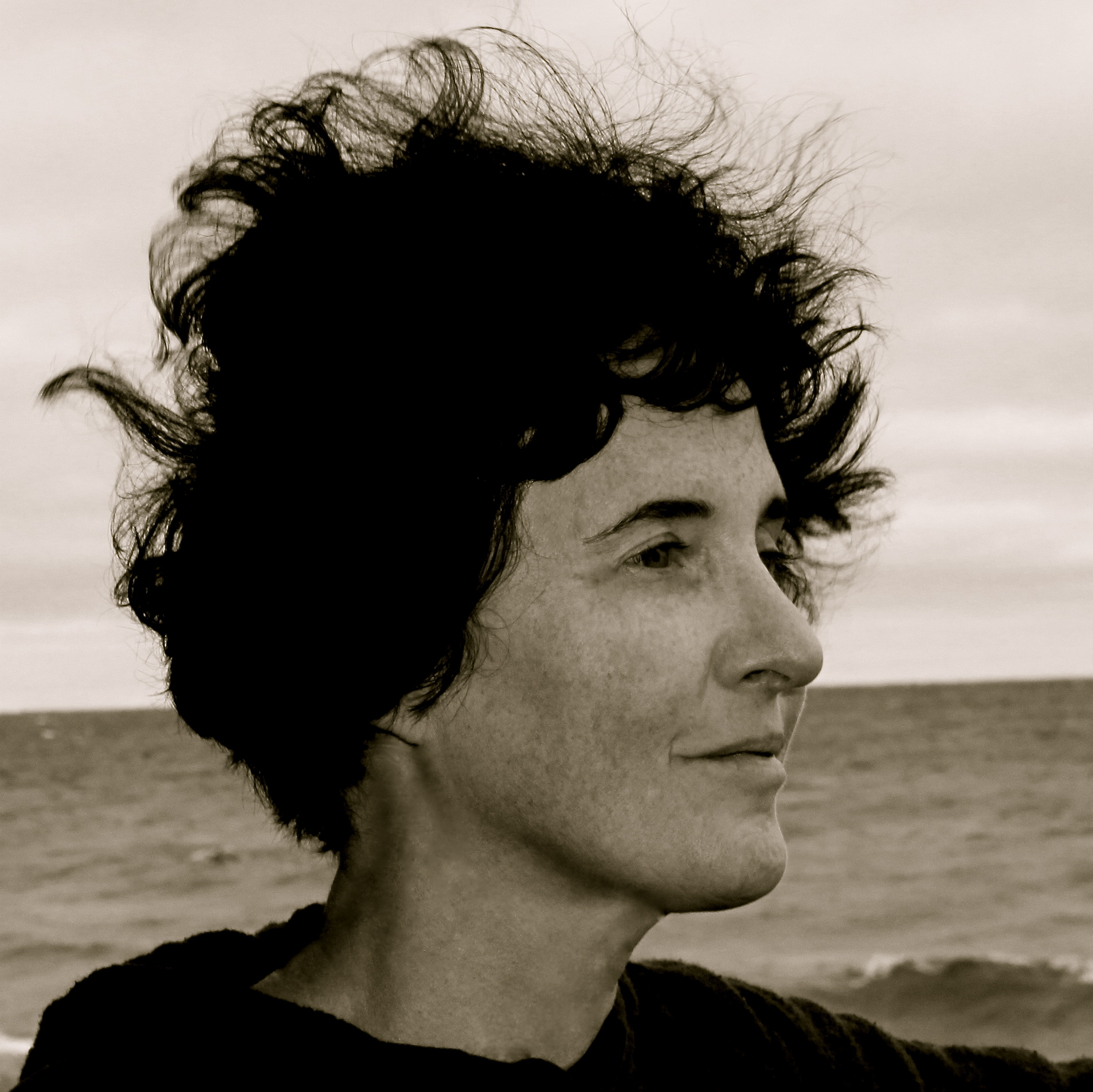
Hilary Scharper

Hilary Scharper (born 1961) is a Canadian novelist and professor of cultural anthropology at the University of Toronto. Scharper's fiction, teaching and research focus on cultural approaches to nature. She writes historical fiction, multi-species fiction, and, self-coined, "ecoGothic" fiction.

== Biography ==
Born in 1961, Scharper grew up in Toronto, Ontario. She attended Yale, where she received her PhD in Anthropology in 1992.

== Writing ==
Scharper's first novel, Perdita (2013) is a gothic novel with strong nature themes. She has characterized her writing as "ecoGothic," a newly minted subgenre that represents a more ecologically aware gothic. Scharper has stated: "I do not treat nature as merely a backdrop or setting, but rather as an active and indeed central player in the narrative." Jennifer Dawson credits Scharper with originating the term "ecoGothic". Critic Robert Douglas has suggested that Scharper's fiction draws upon literary classics such as Emily Brontë's Wuthering Heights and Charlotte Brontë's Jane Eyre, noting that all these novels feature landscapes that are "desolate," "powerful" and "cruel."

Scharper's book of short stories, Dream Dresses (2009), draws upon her experience as an ethnographer and explores women's experiences of dressing over the life cycle. Hollins Critic writes that Scharper "brings to her fiction writing a trained anthropological eye." The Toronto Star wrote that her writing in Dream Dresses was "reminiscent of Thomas Carlyle."

== Selected works ==
=== Fiction ===
- Dream Dresses: Stories (2009) ISBN 978-0-9808879-5-2
- Perdita (2013) ISBN 1-4926-0244-2, ISBN 978-1-4926-0244-6
