= Biophilia hypothesis =

Idea that humans innately seek connections with the natural world

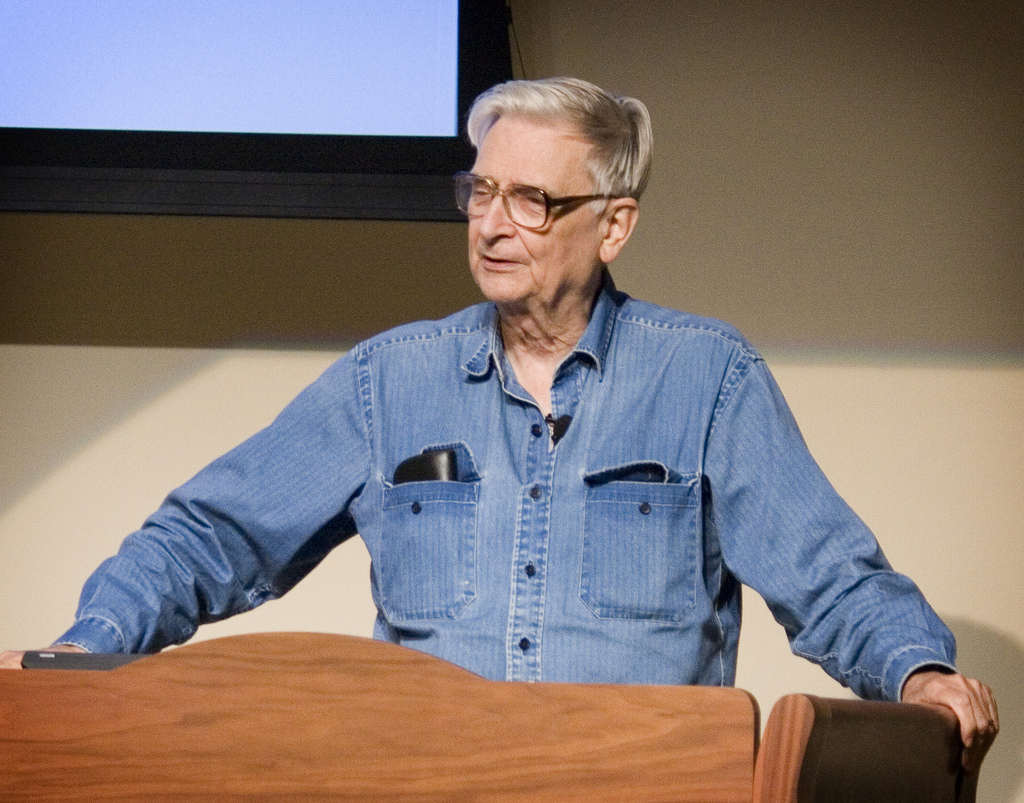
Edward O. Wilson

The biophilia hypothesis (also called BET) suggests that humans possess an innate tendency to seek connections with nature and other forms of life. Edward O. Wilson introduced and popularized the hypothesis in his book, Biophilia (1984). He defines biophilia as the "innate tendency to focus on life and lifelike processes". He argued that "to explore and affiliate with life is a deep and complicated process in mental development. To an extent still undervalued in philosophy and religion, our existence depends on this propensity, our spirit is woven from it, hope rises on its currents". Wilson saw modern biology as converging with biophilia: "Modern biology has produced a genuinely new way of looking at the world that is incidentally congenial to the inner direction of biophilia. In other words, instinct is in this rare instance aligned with reason.... to the degree that we come to understand other organisms, we will place a greater value on them, and on ourselves".

== Natural affinity for living systems ==
"Biophilia" is an innate affinity of life or living systems. The term was first used by Erich Fromm to describe a psychological orientation of being attracted to all that is alive and vital. Wilson uses the term in a related sense when he suggests that biophilia describes "the connections that human beings subconsciously seek with the rest of life." He proposed the possibility that the deep affiliations humans have with other life forms and nature as a whole are rooted in our biology. Both positive and negative (including phobic) affiliations toward natural objects (species, phenomenon) as compared to artificial objects are evidence for biophilia.

Although named by Fromm, the concept of biophilia has been proposed and defined many times over. Aristotle was one of many to put forward a concept that could be summarized as "love of life". Diving into the term philia, or friendship, Aristotle evokes the idea of reciprocity and how friendships are beneficial to both parties in more than just one way, but especially in the way of happiness.

The hypothesis has since been developed as part of theories of evolutionary psychology. Taking on an evolutionary perspective, people being drawn towards life and nature can be explained in part due to our evolutionary history of residing in natural environments, as only recently in our history have we shifted towards an urbanized lifestyle. These connections to nature can still be seen in people today as people gravitate towards, identify with, and desire to connect with nature. These connections are not limited to any one component part of nature, as people show connections to a wide range of natural things including plants, animals, and environmental landscapes. One possible explanation is that our ancestors who had stronger connections to nature would hold an evolutionary advantage over less connected people as they would have better knowledge and therefore access to food, water, and shelter. In a broader and more general sense research has suggested that our modern urban environments are not suited for minds that evolved in natural environments.

Human preferences toward things in nature, while refined through experience and culture, are hypothetically the product of biological evolution. For example, adult mammals (especially humans) are generally attracted to baby mammal faces with their large eyes and rounded features and find them appealing across species. Similarly, the hypothesis helps explain why ordinary people care for and sometimes risk their lives to save domestic and wild animals, and keep plants and flowers in and around their homes. In the book Children and Nature: Psychological, Sociocultural, and Evolutionary Investigations edited by Peter Kahn and Stephen Kellert, the importance of animals, especially those with which a child can develop a nurturing relationship, is emphasized particularly for early and middle childhood. The same book reports on the help that animals can provide to children with autistic-spectrum disorders.

=== Physiological responses: fractal fluency ===
Fractal fluency is a neuroscience model that proposes that, through exposure to nature's fractal scenery, people's visual systems have adapted to efficiently process fractals with ease. Fractals are patterns that repeat at different scales. Examples in natural scenery include clouds, mountains and trees. This adaptation to fractal patterns occurs at many stages of the visual system, from the way people's eyes move to which regions of the brain get activated. Fluency puts the viewer in a ‘comfort zone’ so inducing an aesthetic experience. Humans appear to be especially well-adapted to processing fractal patterns with fractal dimension between 1.3 and 1.5. When humans view fractal patterns with fractal dimensions in this range, these fractals reduce physiological stress and boost cognitive abilities.

Biophilic fractals are patterns designed to induce the health and well-being benefits associated with exposure to nature's scenery. These include stress-reduction and enhanced cognitive capacity. Designers and architects incorporate biophilic fractals into the built environment to counter the fact that people spend 92% of their time indoors and away from nature's scenery. The Fractal Chapel designed by INNOCAD architecture in the state hospital in Graz, Austria, is a prominent example and recipient of the 2025 IIDA (International Interior Design Association) Best of Competition Award.

== Indigenous perspectives on the human-nature connection ==
Many Indigenous cultures do not draw a sharp distinction between humans and nature. In these traditions, humans may be understood as an integral part of the natural world rather than as separate from it. Human practices and ways of life may be seen to be based in relationships of reciprocity involving all living beings and the environment.

At the heart of such belief systems is the concept of kinship, which extends beyond human relationships and includes elements of the natural world. Humans, other animals, plants and soil are seen as dependent on each other for survival and health. For example, the Haudenosaunee people express this idea through a "Thanksgiving Address", a ceremony intended to honor all aspects of nature.

Some Indigenous cultures have developed what has been referred to as "traditional ecological knowledge". This may include ostensibly sustainable stewardship practices such as controlled burns of vegetation, as employed in some traditional Native American and Aboriginal Australian societies. In Hawaii, the idea of Aloha_ʻĀina aloha has served as a guide for responsible resource use.

Indigenous and animist beliefs typically view nature as sacred. Specific sites, species, or phenomena holding deep significance. Emphasis is put on objectives such as reciprocity and balance. This may imply an idea of nature restoration through sustainable practices, rituals, and ceremonies. For instance, the Anishinaabe make offerings before harvesting wild rice.

== Biophilic design ==
In architecture, biophilic design is a sustainable design strategy that incorporates reconnecting people with the natural environment. It may be seen as a necessary complement to green architecture, which decreases the environmental impact of the built world but does not address human reconnection with the natural world.

Caperna and Serafini define biophilic design as that kind of architecture, which is able to supply our inborn need of connection to life and to the vital processes. Biophilic space has been defined as the environment that strengthens life and supports the sociological and psychological components. These spaces can have positive health effects on people including reducing mental health issues in stressful spaces such as prisons, reducing chronic pain, improving memory, and lowering blood pressure. Examples of this being studied in medical settings include having a window looking out to see living plants is also shown to help speed up the healing process of patients in hospitals. Similarly, having plants in the same room as patients in hospitals also speeds up their healing process.

Biophilic fractals are patterns designed to induce the health and well-being benefits associated with exposure to nature's scenery. These include stress-reduction and enhanced cognitive capacity. Designers and architects incorporate biophilic fractals into the built environment to counter the fact that people spend 92% of their time indoors and away from nature's scenery. ScienceDesignLab's Fractal Chapel in the state hospital in Graz, Austria is a prominent example and recipient of the 2025 IIDA (International Interior Design Association) Best of Competition Award.

== Biophilia and conservation ==
Because of our technological advancements and more time spent inside buildings and cars disconnects us from nature, biophilic activities and time spent in nature may be strengthening our connections as humans to nature, so people continue to have strong urges to reconnect with nature. The concern for a lack of connection with the rest of nature outside of us, is that a stronger disregard for other plants, animals and less appealing wild areas could lead to further ecosystem degradation and species loss. Therefore, reestablishing a connection with nature has become more important in the field of conservation. Examples would be more available green spaces in and around cities, more classes that revolve around nature and implementing smart design for greener cities that integrate ecosystems into them such as biophilic cities. These cities can also become part of wildlife corridors to help with migrational and territorial needs of other animals.

== Biophilia in fiction ==
Canadian author Hilary Scharper explicitly adapted E.O. Wilson's concept of biophilia for her ecogothic novel, Perdita. In the novel, Perdita (meaning "the lost one") is a mythological figure who brings biophilia to humanity.

== See also ==
- Biocultural evolution
- Biomimetics
- Deep ecology
- Ecopsychology
- Ecosexuality
- Environmental psychology
- Healthy building
- Nature deficit disorder
- Nature therapy
- Technobiophilia
