= Eco-cities =

Human settlement closely modeled on natural ecosystems

An eco-city or ecocity is "a human settlement modeled on the self-sustaining resilient structure and function of natural ecosystems", as defined by Ecocity Builders, a non-profit organization started by Richard Register, who first coined the term in his 1984 essay, "EcoCities: Making cities sustainable is a crucial challenge". Simply put, an eco-city is an ecologically healthy city. The World Bank defines eco-cities as "cities that enhance the well-being of citizens and society through integrated urban planning and management that harness the benefits of ecological systems and protect and nurture these assets for future generations". Although there is no universally accepted definition of an 'eco-city', among available definitions, there is some consensus on the basic features of an eco-city.

The cities around the world that face the most severe challenges associated with the world's urban population are those in developing countries. Eco-cities are commonly found to focus on new-build developments, especially in developing nations such as China, wherein foundations are being laid for new eco-cities catering to 500,000 or more inhabitants.

== History ==
=== Origins ===
In the first half of the 19th century, the Garden City of Ebenezer Howard, the urbanistic thought of Frank Lloyd Wright and Le Corbusier laid the foundations for a radical change of paradigm and a comprehensive transformation in the urban planning canon. During the post-war era, there was the spread of modernist tower blocks to satisfy the needs of urban slums.

Initial ideas behind the eco-cities can be traced back to 1975 with the formation of a non-profit organization called Urban Ecology. Founded by a group of architects and activists including Richard Register in Berkeley, California, the organization worked at the intersection of urban planning, ecology, and public participation to help formulate design concepts centered around building environmentally healthier cities. Some of their efforts included initiating movements to plant trees along the main streets, promoting the construction of solar greenhouses, developing environment-friendly policies by working with the Berkeley city planning division and encouraging public transportation. In 1987, Register published the book in which the term eco-city first appeared, Ecocity Berkeley. The book advocated for "rebuilding cities in balance with nature".

During the latter half of the 20th century, concepts surrounding environmentally friendly or nature-conscious communities expanded in scope, coinciding with a deeper understanding of ecological complexities. Recognizing the far-reaching consequences of ecosystem dynamics, pollution, and natural resource depletion, it became clear that a city's ecological footprint must be managed not only at the local level but also regionally and globally. An example of this is Wolman's urban metabolism model, which established a comprehensive accounting system for all materials and resources required by a city. McHarg, on the other hand, emphasized the necessity of city planning that aligns with the ecological and environmental conditions specific to each site.

In the 1990s, there were two important events that began the initiative for eco-city developments. The first event involved the publication of the Brundtland Report. The Brundtland Report presented the idea of sustainable development. The second event occurred in 1992 at the United Nations Earth Summit. The members at the summit created a plan to apply sustainable development to our cities. The Eco-cities that were developed during this time period incorporated the concept of sustainable development. However, a majority of the developments were created to provide a vision of an eco-city.

In his 2002 book Ecocities: Building Cities in Balance with Nature, Register re-defined his concept of the eco-city as a means to address climate change, characterizing the eco-city as "an urban environmental system in which input (of resources) and output (of waste) are minimized."

Eco-Cities in China have received strong support from the government since the early 2000s as a policy to confront the nation's challenges with rapid urbanization and climate change. China now boasts the world's largest eco-city development program, with hundreds of eco-city projects currently in development.

=== Organizations ===
Urban Ecology further advanced the movement when they hosted the first International Ecocity Conference in Berkeley, California in 1990. The conference focused on urban sustainability problems and encouraged over 800 participants from 13 countries to submit proposals on best practices to reform cities for a better urban ecological balance.

Following this, in 1992, Richard Register founded the non-profit organization Ecocity Builders, to advance a set of goals outlined in the conference. Since its conception, the organization has been the convener of the International Ecocity Conference Series, now known as Ecocity World. The IECS has been the longest standing international conference series consisting of biennial Ecocity World Summits and has been held in Adelaide, Australia (1992); Yoff, Senegal (1996); Curitiba, Brazil (2000); Shenzhen, China (2002); Bangalore, India (2006); San Francisco, United States (2008); Istanbul, Turkey (2009); Montreal, Canada (2011); Nantes, France (2013); Abu Dhabi, UAE (2015), Melbourne, Australia (2017); Vancouver, Canada (2019); and Rotterdam, the Netherlands (2022).

Other leading figures include architect Paul F. Downton and authors Timothy Beatley and Steffen Lehmann, who have written extensively on the subject.

The United Nations and other non-governmental organizations promote and support the eco-city concept. In 2010, the World Bank began its Eco2 Cities initiative, providing financial and intellectual support to eco-city projects in developing countries.

== Current trends ==
A video explaining the basic concept of 'continuous sidewalks' that are used extensively in countries like the Netherlands and Denmark, being safer and more consistent with sustainable transport goals.

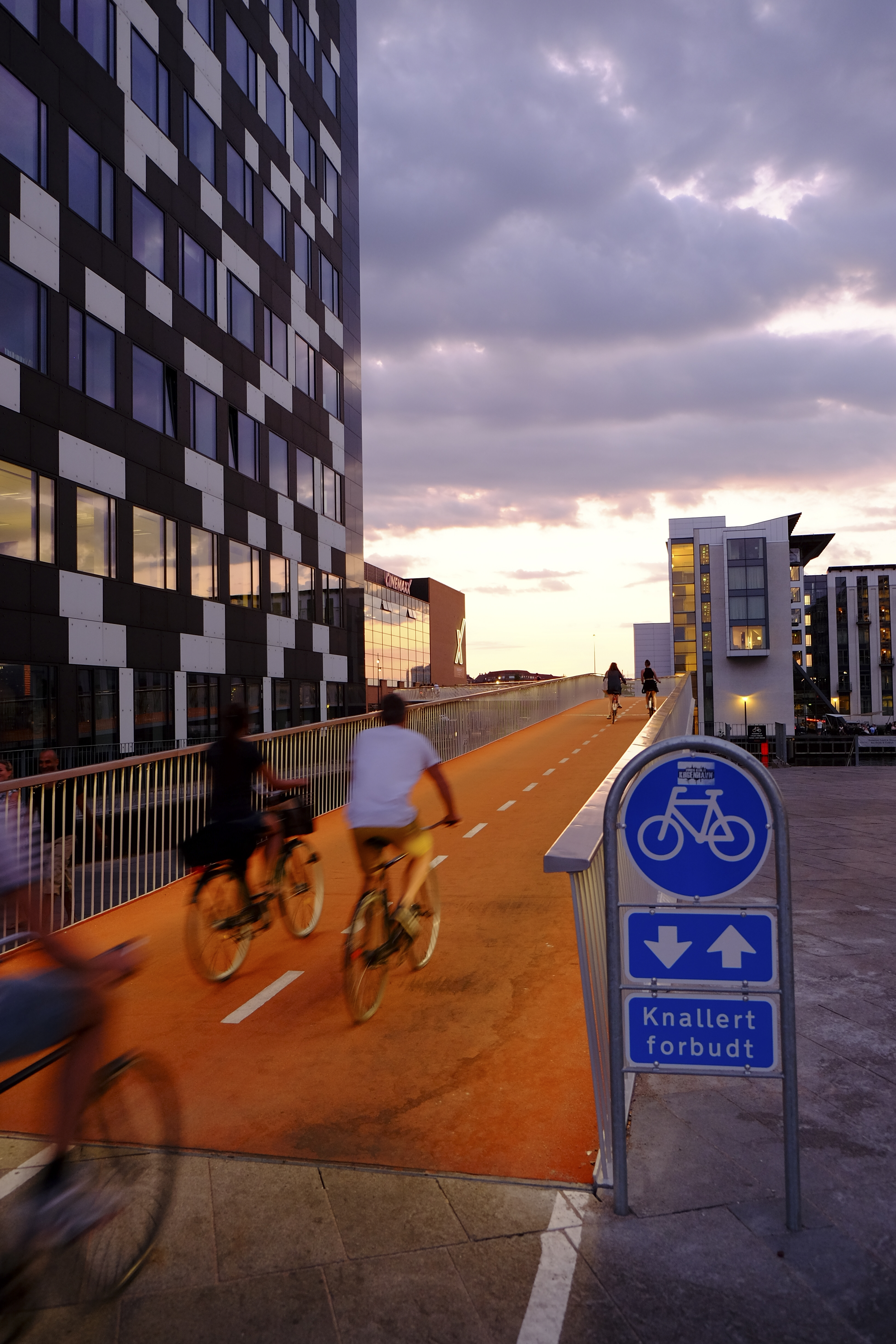
Copenhagen has extensive cycling infrastructure.

=== Criteria ===
An ideal eco-city has frequently been described as one that fulfills the following requirements:

- Operates on a self-contained economy that obtains resources locally
- Is entirely carbon-neutral by promoting techniques like the use and production of renewable energy
- Is established over a well-planned city layout that promotes walkability, biking and the use of public transportation systems
- Promotes conservation of resource by maximizing water efficiency and energy efficiency, while managing an ecologically beneficial waste management system that promotes recycling and reuse to create a zero-waste system
- Restores environmentally damaged urban areas
- Ensures decent and affordable housing for all socio-economic and ethnic groups and improves jobs opportunities for disadvantaged groups, such as women, minorities, and the disabled
- Supports local agriculture and produce
- Supports future progress and expansion over time.

Besides these, each individual eco-city has an additional set of requirements to ensure ecological and economic benefits that may range from large-scale targets like zero-waste and zero-carbon emissions, as seen in the Sino-Singapore Tianjin Eco-city project and the Abu Dhabi Masdar City project, to smaller-scale interventions like urban revitalization and establishment of green roofs as seen in the case of Augustenborg, Malmö, Sweden. Cities that focus on the use of carbon-free sustainable energy and on managing greenhouse gas emissions can be referred to as zero-carbon cities.

Terms like "low-carbon city" and "green city" are often used interchangeably with "eco-city".

=== Nature Based Solutions ===
Recent scholarly focus on eco-cities establishes nature-based solutions as a defining trend in eco-city development, highlighting a crucial shift from technology-centric fixes toward multifunctional green and blue infrastructure that delivers climate, health, and equity benefits. Work led by McPherson and colleagues postulates that mainstreaming nature-based solutions through planning, finance, and governance is central to sustainable urban transitions globally.

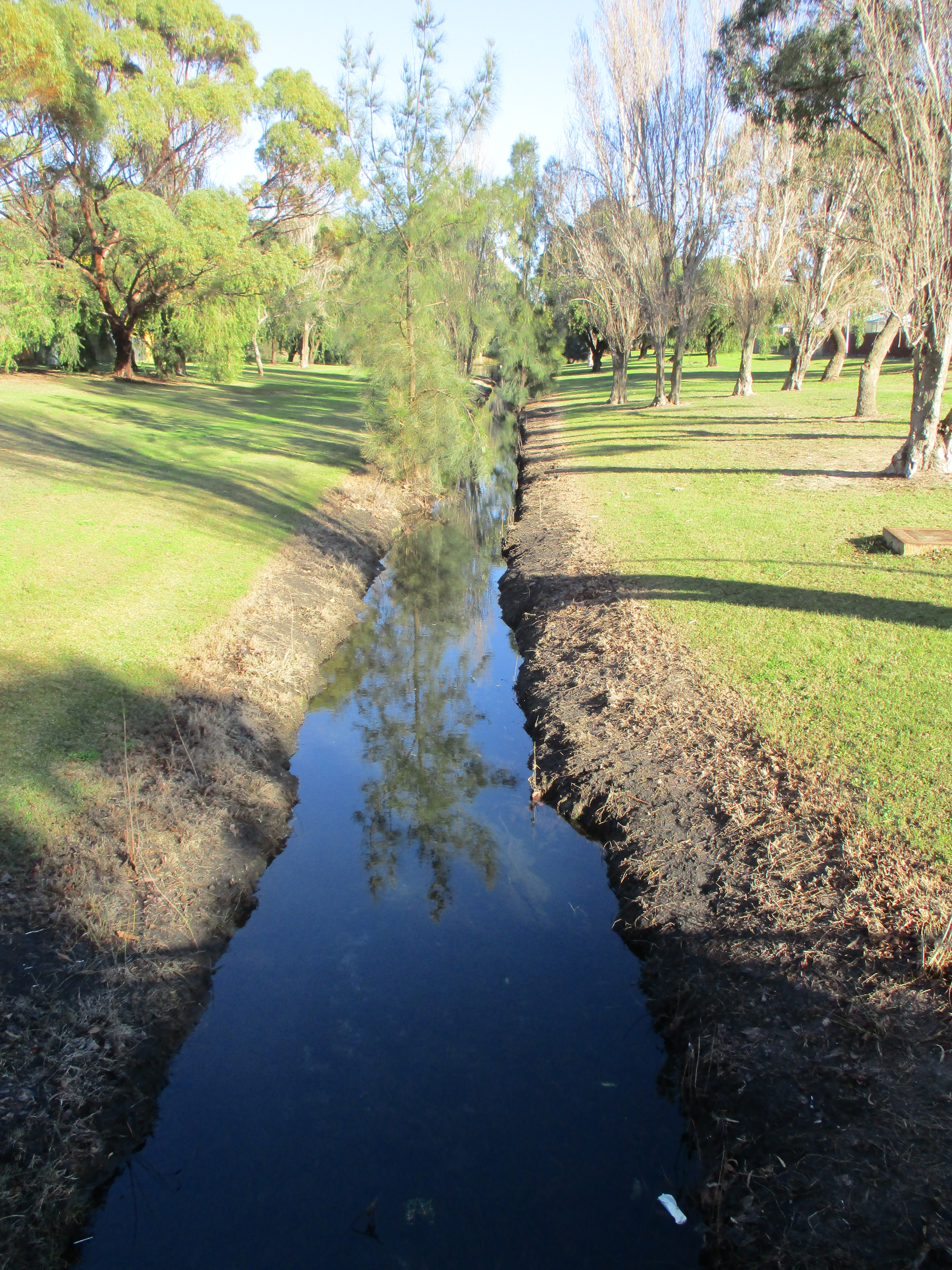
Stormwater drainage canal in Rockingham, Western Australia. Carries excess rainwater away from streets towards larger bodies of water to help deal with flooding. Example of blue infrastructure.

Eco-cities are increasingly adopting nature-based solutions to address a myriad of urban challenges at once, including heat, flooding, air quality, biodiversity loss, and social well-being. Because these interventions (e.g., urban forests, green roofs, wetlands, flood-able parks) provide co-benefits that grey infrastructure traditionally cannot, they are becoming ever-more important in the logistics of establishing successful eco-cities.

Conceptual and empirical frameworks developed in 2025 show how nature-based solutions link ecosystem services to functional urban environments, offering a dedicated and consistent framework when it comes to policy and design decisions.

=== Mainstreaming mechanisms ===
Mainstreaming nature-based solutions means embedding them into routine infrastructure, planning, budgeting, regulation, government, and finance rather than treating them like an isolated solution. Scholarly research suggests a number of mechanisms by which this level of integration can be achieved.

Planning, regulation, and policy instruments: Cities are increasingly adopting policies that link nature-based solutions directly to critical issues, such as climate adaptation/mitigation, biodiversity, health, equity, and urban development. McPherson and colleagues research shows how regions are already establishing frameworks that position nature-based solutions as part of the infrastructure tapestry.

Zoning and land-use regulations: Changing land-use codes or zoning rules to require or fiscally incentivize green and blue infrastructure. Helps to establish nature-based solutions as a necessity rather than an optional component of an urban environment.

Building codes and standards: Mandates for green roofs, street tree planning requirements, and standards for stormwater retention via natural systems. These embed nature-based solutions into pre-existing environments allowing for flexibility and ultimately mainstream uptake.

Cross-departmental coordination: Because nature-based solutions overlap with multiple urban issues, such as climate, water, health, urban design, transportation, and biodiversity, mainstreaming requires breaking departmental barriers so that regulations align across sectors. A 2023 study by Hölscher et al. argues this is essential to mainstreaming nature-based solutions.

=== Quantifiable Indicators of Eco-city Performance ===
Criteria of eco-cities can be used as measurable indicators to compare their performance over time by evaluating eco-efficiency, biodiversity outcomes, and eco-system service benefits.

==== Eco-efficiency ====
Eco-efficiency can be measured via ratio-based metrics, most often using data-envelopment analysis (DEA) that compare outputs that are desirable (higher GDP, services delivered) with undesirable outputs (CO2, PM2.5, wastewater). This allows for benchmarking across multiple cities and can give a standard template for efficiency goals.

DEA is a non-parametric method of evaluation that uses multiple input and output variables at the same time to compare relative performance between cities. Typical inputs can be about consumption of resources or polluting factors like energy use, land consumption, or emissions. A typical output could represent desired socioeconomic outcomes such as employment, service coverage, and gross regional product. DEA will give an efficiency score in a range from 0 to 1 based on the efficiency of converting inputs into positive outputs while minimizing undesirable outcomes. DEA is useful for assessing urban sustainability as it accounts for multiple indicators and doesn’t require an assumed production function, allowing for comparison among cities at varying scales. This method was applied to test across 36 Chinese provincial capitals to show how eco-efficiency scores can expose trade-offs between economic productivity and environmental burden.

==== Biodiversity Outcomes ====
Measure of the status and trends of species diversity and habitats in cities using standard biodiversity signals at a city-wide scale, aligned with the IUCN Urban Nature Indexes (UNI).

Biodiversity-focused indicators evaluate the ecology within cities, including the richness of native species, ratio of threatened species, extent of natural habitats, and the impacts on biodiversity caused by nature-based solutions (NbS). These metrics can help to evaluate eco-city performance by track both urban ecosystems and the effectiveness of human efforts to protect or restore them.

Emerging biodiversity assessment tools used by government bodies such as the City Biodiversity Index (CBI) allow for cities to use standardized methods to report things like species status and habitat conditions.

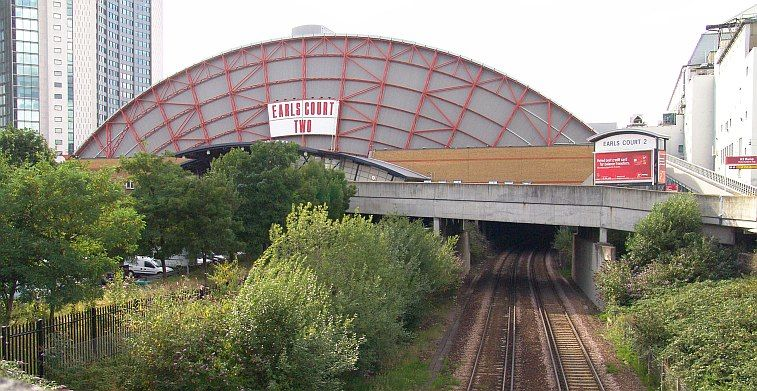
Green corridor in Fulham, United Kingdom. Example of green infrastructure that helps native species and general biodiversity.

Biodiversity indicators are more commonly now including measures of habitat connectivity and community composition. Metrics for connectivity such as effective mesh size or corridor continuity are important because separation of habitats limit movement and gene flow, which make species more susceptible to population decline. For this reason, most eco-city strategies prioritize establishing green corridors, riparian buffers, and tree canopy networks to conserve existing ecological systems in urban environments. Cities can also keep track of changes in species abundance or functional diversity, helping to understand whether ecological communities are becoming better able to withstand the pressures of their urban environment over time.

Nature-based solutions play an important part in producing better biodiversity outcomes. Examples of NbS include wetland restoration, green roofs, and urban forest expansion. These methods often result in improved conditions for native species due to an increase in habitat complexity. Examination of data from multiple studies show that most NbS projects report positive impacts on biodiversity. Standardization of reporting using frameworks like the CBI and UNI allow for comparisons globally between cities and is important to keep track of long-term progress towards conservation and restoration goals.

==== Ecosystem Service Benefits ====
Ecosystem-service indicators are used to quantify the benefits that are provided by nature to urban populations, such as micro-climate cooling, stormwater retentions, carbon reduction, removal of air-pollution, and access to green space. These metrics are useful for evaluating the multifunctional benefits of NbS and how ecology and human well-being are linked.

Using ecosystem services to assess an eco-city is considered essential because they are able to show how natural systems can help cities adapt to environmental pressures like natural disasters or climate change, while improving public health. An example of this is micro-climate cooling, which is usually measured using surface or air temperature differences between areas with vegetation and without vegetation. This demonstrates how tree canopy and green roofs can reduce heat stress. In a similar fashion, metrics for stormwater retention quantify the amount of runoff that is avoided due to permeable surfaces, wetlands, and sustainable urban drainage systems (SuDS). These important factors can lower the risk of flooding and reduce pressure on drainage networks. Carbon storage is often analyzed through urban forest inventories and modeling tools, which provide insight into how cities offset emissions and increase long-term resistance to climate change.

Another important indicator is access to green space, as it links ecological conditions to social outcomes like recreation, physical health, and mental well-being. Many cities report the percentage of residents living within walking distance of parks and greenery as a part of their sustainability goals. NbS projects are often evaluated for their ability to provide multiple ecosystem services at the same time. Studies show that a single intervention like a restored stream corridor, can improve water quality, support biodiversity, reduce heat, and offer opportunities for recreational activities.

Category	Indicator	What it measures	Typical unit or method
Eco-efficiency	Composite eco-efficiency (DEA)	Relative efficiency of converting resources/emissions into socioeconomic output	Unitless DEA score (0–1)
Eco-efficiency	CO₂ intensity of economic output	Emissions produced per unit GDP	tCO₂e per USD (PPP)
Eco-efficiency	Energy productivity	Economic output per unit of final energy use	USD per GJ
Eco-efficiency	Air-pollution efficiency	Population served per tonne of PM2.5 emitted	Persons per tonne PM2.5
Biodiversity outcomes	Native species richness	Number and proportion of native species present within city boundaries	Raw species count; % native
Biodiversity outcomes	Threatened species status	Share of species classified as threatened based on IUCN criteria	% threatened species; Red List Index
Biodiversity outcomes	Habitat extent and connectivity	Area and spatial connectedness of semi-natural habitats and green corridors	Hectares; effective mesh size; % connected area
Biodiversity outcomes	Biodiversity response to NbS	Proportion of nature-based solutions (NbS) projects that increase biodiversity	% NbS projects with positive biodiversity outcomes
Ecosystem-service benefits	Urban heat-mitigation effect	Cooling provided by vegetation and green infrastructure	Δ°C difference (from remote sensing or microclimate sensors)
Ecosystem-service benefits	Stormwater retention / flood mitigation	Runoff volume avoided due to permeable surfaces, wetlands, and green infrastructure	Runoff volume avoided due to permeable surfaces, wetlands, and green infrastructure

=== Digital and Artificial Intelligence Layer ===
Artificial Intelligence (AI) and the Artificial Intelligence of Things have emerged as key elements of technological infrastructure for eco-cities, offering sophisticated solutions for optimization, mobility, and resource management purposes. Featuring interconnected sensor technologies and edge computing infrastructure, Artificial Intelligence of Things enables cities to monitor environmental variables, anticipate shifts in demand, control dispersed renewable energy resources, as well as govern mobility systems in a more efficient manner, causing reduced harm to the environment.

An increasing amount of literature shows that this digit-ecological transition of recent years has progressed from the outdated concept of a "smart city" to an eco-city, which is much more sustainable, data- versus function-based, using Artificial Intelligence to integrate digitization into the ecological cycles of cities, including those of energy, water, waste, and transport, to name a few.

As argued by Bibri (2024), AI and the Artificial Intelligence of Things technologies are revamping the paradigm of sustainable urbanism, as they make possible the autonomous management of urban systems in an adaptive manner. Machine learning applications in predictive energy management allow for dynamic balancing of demand and supply in smart grids, whereas AI-enabled microgrids leverage solar, wind, as well as storage facilities in an urban region in an integrated manner. In transport infrastructure, AI applications in multimodal transport optimization, as well as in autonomous vehicles, result in substantially reduced congestion as well as emissions.

In addition to the energy sector, transport, and other essential sectors, Artificial Intelligence of Things technologies also support urban functional capabilities in waste management, water optimization, and building management. For example, waste management systems using sensors have the ability to monitor waste levels, map routes for waste collection, as well as manage logistics for waste recycling in the context of a circular economy. Smart-building solutions utilize AI to control lighting, temperature, and air-conditioning systems as a function of occupancy and environmental variables, thus lowering total consumption of energy. All these examples illustrate how an increasingly sophisticated digital layer is taking shape as an integral infrastructural layer of eco-cities, which seamlessly integrates physical systems as well as virtual systems for sustainable functioning. However, this shift also raises multiple issues of an ethics, technological, as well as ecological nature.

Large-scale AI infrastructure further hampers sustainability by increasing electronic waste, which could be countered if they run using renewable energy resources. Data protection, transparency, as well as control issues continue to be significant, especially in an urban scenario, which increasingly banked upon privilege-based technological companies for maintaining critical infrastructure of cities. Furthermore, it is also possible that increased divides in digital society also widen inequality gaps by leaving Behind marginalized communities in technologically advanced urban systems. These issues demand comprehensive, internationally acceptable, as well as ethically designed AI approaches in order to ensure sustainability from a green technological transition of cities.

=== Eco-city Framework and Standards ===
With a growing popularity of the concept, in the last few decades, there has been an exponential growth in the number of eco-cities established around the globe. To assess the performance of these eco-cities and provide future guidance, the Ecocity Framework and Standards, established by Ecocity Builders with technical support from the British Columbia Institute of Technology School of Construction and the Environment, provides a practical methodology for this to ensure progress towards the intended goals of eco-cities. The four pillars in this framework include:

- Urban design (containing 4 criteria for access by proximity)
- Bio-geo physical features (containing 6 criteria for the responsible management of resources and materials as well as the generation and use of clean, renewable energy)
- Socio-cultural features (containing 5 criteria for promoting cultural activities and community participation)
- Ecological imperatives (containing 3 criteria to sustaining and restoring biodiversity)

Using these, the International Eco-Cities Initiative recently identified and rated as many as 178 significant eco-city initiatives at different stages of planning and implementation around the world. To be included in this census, initiatives needed to be at least district-wide in their scale, covering a variety of sectors, and have official policy status. Although such schemes display great variety in their ambitions, scale, and conceptual underpinnings, since the late 2000s there has been an international proliferation of frameworks of urban sustainability indicators and processes designed to be implemented across different contexts. This may suggest that a process of eco-city 'standardization' is underway.

VTT Technical Research Centre of Finland has formulated an EcoCity concept tailored to address the unique requirements of developing countries and emerging economies. Prominent reference examples include EcoCity Miaofeng in China, EcoNBC in Egypt, EcoGrad in St. Petersburg, Russia, UN Gigiri in Kenya, and MUF2013 in Tanzania. The modern challenges confronting cities, such as climate change and its interconnected social and technological issues, encompass climate mitigation, urban sustainability, housing affordability, integrated planning, energy accessibility, local capacity building, citizen engagement, and overarching concerns like gender equality and poverty reduction. VTT's EcoCity concept effectively addresses these challenges through collaborative partnerships with local stakeholders, enabling tailored solutions that align with specific local socio-economic contexts.

=== Practical limits ===
Richard Register once stated that "An ecocity is an ecologically healthy city. No such city exists". Despite the conceptual ecological benefits of eco-cities, actual implementation can be difficult to attain. The conversion of existing cities to eco-cities is uncommon because the infrastructure, both in terms of the physical city layout and local bureaucracy, are often major insurmountable obstacles to large-scale sustainable development. The high cost of the technological integration necessary for eco-city development is a major challenge, as many cities either can't afford, or are not willing to take on, the extra costs. Such issues, along with the added challenges and limits to retrofitting existing cities contribute to the establishment of newly constructed eco-cities. Along with this, the costs and infrastructure development needed to manage these large scale, two-pronged projects extend beyond the capabilities of most cities. In addition, many cities around the world are currently struggling to maintain the status quo, with budgetary issues, low growth rates, and transportation inefficiencies, that encourage reactive, coping policies. While there are many examples worldwide, the development of eco-cities is still limited due to the vast challenges and high costs associated with sustainability.

=== Related terminologies ===
Eco-cities have been developed as a response to present-day unsustainable systems that exist in our cities. Simultaneously, there have been other concepts like smart cities, sustainable cities, and biophilic cities that also strive towards achieving sustainability in cities through different approaches. Owing to ambiguity in their definitions and closely related criteria defined to achieve their goals, these concepts, despite their varying approaches, are often used interchangeably.

== Case-studies ==
=== Sino-Singapore Tianjin Eco-City ===
A study of the Sino-Singapore Tianjin Eco-City that significant progress has been achieved through Tianjin Eco-city regarding environmental conditions, ecological mobility, and sustainable infrastructure, but many residents harbored concerns regarding services, affordability, and social integration, depending on community relocation and new high-income groups of migrants.

The Tianjin Eco-City case demonstrates that, similarly, socioeconomic impacts, including changes in housing markets, job markets, and community, may impact considerably the perceived and actual success of eco-city projects. Haoxi Chen and colleagues found that lived experiences can offer considerably more insight into who benefits from sustainability actions by focusing their research on lived experiences, which can then expose inequities that may emerge between planned and lived outcomes.

== Criticism ==
=== Three pitfalls ===
Looking at the patterns of progress in the last few decades of city construction towards sustainability, Valaria Saiu (University of Cagliari) poses one major criticism through the existence of a theory-practice gap caused by economic and ethical conflicts and risks that generate socio-spatial utopias. She identifies three pitfalls in the concept of sustainable cities (and therefore, eco-cities):

1. The idea of the city as a business: "Most eco-city projects are dependent on technologies available on the global market and the city is considered as a big economic affair". Often developed as techno-centric concepts, these projects seek investment opportunities by public-private partnerships leading to a top-down approach. This structure lacks democratic approaches in the decision-making process which further contributes to running high risks of failure, especially in social terms.
2. The oversimplification of urban complexity: Due to the nature of current trends in measuring sustainability, there has been a strong focus in the quantifiable aspects of sustainability like energy-efficiency or waste-efficiency. This creates a tendency of oversimplification by neglecting the social and political aspects of the city that are unmeasurable qualitative aspects, yet significant to the fundamental concept of eco-cities.
3. The quest for the ideal community: This section of the criticism focuses on the practical limits to merging economic goals with social goals in the urban development process. "Under the banner of green technology, inhabitants are forced to pay higher costs for their use of facilities in eco-cities."

=== Eco-cities as isolated entities ===
Another larger conceptual criticism faced by eco-cities stems from the ambiguity in the definition of sustainability as a term. This has been further elaborated by Mike Hodson and Simon Marvin in their article titled 'Urbanism in the Anthropocene: Ecological Urbanism or Premium Ecological Enclaves' where they noted "We have tended to refer to sustainability in a generic sense, and our discussions of sustainability could be employed to anything that has sustainable as an adjective". As a result of this, a widespread trend has been observed in the growing number of eco-cities developed over the past two decades that claim to combat our current global climate-change challenges. Many of these cities are found to be established in isolation from other existing urban centers due to the nature of their ownership. Owing to this isolation, internalization of resource-flows contribute towards a shallow sense of ecological sustainability in such cities.

With regard to methods of emissions counting cities can be challenging as production of goods and services within their territory can be related either to domestic consumption or exports. Conversely the citizens also consume imported goods and services. To avoid double counting in any emissions calculation it should be made clear where the emissions are to be counted: at the site of production or consumption. This may be complicated given long production chains in a globalized economy. Moreover, the embodied energy and consequences of large-scale raw material extraction required for renewable energy systems and electric vehicle batteries is likely to represent its own complications – local emissions at the site of utilization are likely to be very small but life-cycle emissions can still be significant.

=== Urban ecological security and the social, economic and environmental impacts of eco-cities ===
Eco-cities have also been criticized to have biases towards the economic and environmental pillars of sustainability while neglecting the social pillar. The practical translations of the concept have faced criticism as eco-cities have been driven by the demand for bounded ecological security. By offering "premium ecological enclaves" factoring ecological security as an outcome of private investments driving the construction of eco-cities, the existing examples of eco-cities are criticized for not being truly sustainable solutions. On the contrary, by placing this concept in the meta-narrative of sustainable cities, these have also been further criticized for celebrating this fragmentation of society through the development of gated communities and premium ecological enclaves isolated from the real global scale of issues in today's ecological crisis. For instance, the eco-cities of Masdar and Hong Kong pose homogeneous visions, but have been criticized to be the source of fragmentation of urban society.

The term "Frankenstein Urbanism" was used by Federico Cugurullo to metaphorically symbolize this criticism of the concept that increases social stratification in exchange for ecological security, creating isolated entities that could work perfectly within themselves, but fall apart when brought in a larger view.

== See also ==
- Building insulation
- Cyclability
- Cycling infrastructure
- Ecohouse
- Ecovillage
- Energy-plus building
- Environmental planning
- Green building
- Green infrastructure
- Green urbanism
- Inclusive Development
- List of low-energy building techniques
- Low-energy house
- Low impact developments (LIDs)
- Passive solar building design
- Quadruple glazing
- Small wind turbine
- Smart city
- Solar architecture
- Sustainability measurement
- Sustainable city
- Urban farming
- Urban forest inequity
- Urban forestry
- Urban green space
- Urban reforestation
- Urban vitality
- Walking audit
- Zero heating building
- Zero-carbon city
- Zero-energy building
