= Ecocity Builders =

U.S. nonprofit organization

- Formation: 1992; 34 years ago
- Founder: Richard Register
- Headquarters: Oakland, California, US
- Exec. Dir.: Kirstin Miller
- President: Richard Register
- Website: ecocitybuilders.org

Ecocity Builders is a 501(c) non profit located in Oakland, California, that provides advocacy, consulting, and education in sustainable city planning with a focus on access by proximity and pedestrian-oriented development. Ecocity Builders also implements urban design projects utilizing a large network of alliances with city governments, businesses and NGOs. Ecocity Builders' approach is based the work of founder Richard Register, an American artist, peace activist and urban theorist.

== Core principles ==
Ecocity Builders is primarily concerned with promoting the creation of ecocities, a term first coined by Richard Register in his 1984 essay, "EcoCities: Making cities sustainable is a crucial challenge". Ecocity Builders defines an ecocity as an "ecologically healthy human settlement modeled on the self-sustaining resilient structure and function of natural ecosystems and living organisms." An ecocity can encompass any size of settlement, from neighborhood or village up to metropolis, that functions in harmony with the ecosystems of which it is part. These greater environmental systems include the watershed, bioregion, and ultimately, of the planet, as well as human social systems such as local, regional, national and world economic, governmental, and cultural exchange systems.

Biometrics is central to the Ecocity concept through the analogy of the cities as living organisms. Cities (including their inhabitants) exhibit and require systems for movement (transport), respiration (processes to obtain energy), sensitivity (responding to its environment), growth (evolving/changing over time), reproduction (including education, construction, planning and development, etc.), excretion (outputs and wastes), and nutrition (need for air, water, soil, food for inhabitants, materials, etc.).

Ecocities exhibit characteristic design elements such as pedestrian-oriented "nodes" or centers of resources and social interaction, mixed-use planning, pervasive natural features (gardens, urban agriculture, parks), de-emphasis on individual vehicular transit, and equitable access to resources. Register's ecocities are influenced by the arcology movement including an emphasis on hyperstructures—large, complex interconnected buildings. Register has published collections of his extensive drawings of ecocity plans and interventions in several books (see “Sources”).

== History and early years ==
Ecocity Builders was founded by Richard Register in 1992 in order to further specific aims of the first International Ecocity Conference (Berkeley, 1990). The first conference was convened by the Urban Ecology group, an organization also founded by Richard Register. Ecocity Builders went on to involve many of the same key actors as Urban Ecology. Ecocity Builders' early years were characterized by a number of local projects in the San Francisco East Bay, primarily Berkeley. These projects included creek daylighting Cordonices Creek, Slow Streets, and community projects.

=== Creek daylighting ===
Ecocity Builders flagship project included one of the earliest daylighted and restored creek beds in the United States. The Codornices Creek project, 1994, removed the water channel from its cement culvert along the Albany/Berkeley border and created a mile-long park. Ecocity Builders collaborated with the Urban Creeks Council, who applied for and received $25,000 from the Department of Water Resources Board to fund the project. The second lower half of the creek park was restored in 2004 on a budget of $2.1 million under the auspices of the Codornices Creek Watershed Council.

=== Depaving ===
Ecocity Builders helped plan and provided support for a variety of small to medium-sized depaving projects in Berkeley. Examples include removing five parking spaces at University Avenue Homes' low income residence for a garden, and Halcyon Commons. The latter converted a 28 space parking lot into a community-designed mini-park featuring a large grassy area surrounded by flowering shrubs and trees, a picnic area, and a tire swing.

=== Slow streets ===
Starting in 1979 Richard Register and other Berkeley activists began advocating the City of Berkeley for traffic-calming street plans based on the Australian "slow ways" streets. The Milvia Slow Street, part of the City of Berkeley's Bicycle Boulevard network, was finally designed under their guidance in 1990. The design covers roughly six blocks of residential street in which 30 curb bulb-outs were placed to narrow the street at intersections and mid-block locations. These bulb-outs and planted islands create a serpentine design, which requires vehicles to slow and negotiate a winding path along the street. Official studies confirmed the Milvia Slow Street to have a significant calming impact on vehicle speed and volume along the corridor.

=== Ecocity district mapping ===
Richard Register piloted a method for identifying “urban villages” in large urban areas in his book Ecocity Berkeley (1987). He proposed the eventual densification of these areas to create more compact, efficient urban entities where goods and services can be accessed via walking and biking. Ecocity Builders conducted early GIS mapping projects to formalize this process. The results identified actual active urban nodes (clusters of commercial, social and transit activity) as opposed to the on-the-book zoning for commercial/transit centers. They also identified barriers in these areas to being “complete” service access, such as a lack of large grocery store in West Oakland, and lack of integrated transit in Montclair Village.

=== Policy and advocacy ===
In Berkeley Ecocity Builders successfully co-authored and lobbied for policies that are currently enforced, including the Ecocity Amendment to the 2001 General Plan, the Solar Greenhouse Ordinance, and the Residential Energy Conservation Ordinance (RECO).

Task Forces, Committees

- UC Hotel Conference Center Task Force, Berkeley
- San Francisco Open Space Task Force, San Francisco
- Oil Independent Oakland by 2020 Task Force, Oakland

Policies, Campaigns

- Oil Independent Oakland Action Plan
- “Ecocity” Transfer of Development Rights
- Ecocity Amendment
- Berkeley RECO Ordinance
- Berkeley Solar Greenhouse Ordinance

== Current projects ==
=== International Ecocity Framework and Standards (IEFS) ===
The British Columbia Institute of Technology's School of Construction and the Environment and Ecocity Builders worked together to develop a scientific rubric for evaluating the Ecocity status of a human settlement. The rubric is based on 12 environmental, social, and resource-based indicators of urban health. The IEFS forms the basis for several other partnerships and projects aiming to measure, map, and act on these indicators.

=== Ecocitizen World Map Project ===
The Ecocitizen World Map Project is a suite of tools and methods that uses PUMIS and GIS technology to explore, understand, and measure holistic urban health from a citizen's perspective. The project provides an online mapping platform allowing residents to access and combine local, community-uploaded data with open-government data on key indicators such as air and water quality, access to transit, crime, and cultural amenities. The indicators measured by mapping align with the IEFS and can be used to evaluate a city or neighborhood's ecocity status.

The first Ecocitizen World Map Project pilots were conducted in April 2014 in the cities of Cairo and Casablanca. Students and community members participated in "bootcamps" to learn PUMIS surveying techniques and conducted parcel audits in the neighborhoods of Roches Noires and Imbaba. Initial surveying focused on water use.

The participatory approach to data collection enables stakeholders to acquire previously unknown data and is designed to empower local communities to engage in relevant issues, giving them incentive to become involved in finding solutions to existing problems.

This Ecocitizen World Map Project is a public-private partnership led by Ecocity Builders in collaboration with principal initial partners the Organization of American States (OAS), Esri, the Association of American Geographers, Eye on Earth (a partnership of UNEP + Abu Dhabi Environmental Data Initiative), along with local academic partners, NGOs and community organizations. The project's initial three pilot cities include Medellín, Colombia (supported by a grant from the OAS’ Sustainable Communities in the Americas Initiative), Cairo, Egypt, and Casablanca, Morocco (supported by a grant from Eye on Earth).

=== Advising and consulting ===
Ecocity Builders provides a set of policy development and advocacy tools as well as contracting as an adviser for projects worldwide. Ecocity Builders and Richard Register have consulted on construction, planning and development in Auroville, India; Changwon, South Korea, Willits, California, Dhaka, Bangladesh, Huaibei, China, Kathmandu, Nepal, and Tianjin Ecocity, China.

=== Ecocity World Summit Series ===
Chief ongoing project of Ecocity Builders is the biennial conference series known as the Ecocity World Summit (formerly the International Ecocity Conference Series). The series focuses on key actions cities and citizens can take to rebuild human habitat in balance with living systems. The conference focuses on design, planning, data-gathering, and governance of creating sustainable, equitable cities. This Ecocity Summit series, begun in Berkeley, California in 1990, was a first of its kind and is now the longest continuously running conference on ecological towns, cities and villages.

Past World Summits have featured a wide range of leaders and innovators, including environmentalist David Brower; Apollo 14 astronaut Edgar Mitchell; Rusong Wang, member of the Chinese Peoples Congress and head of the environmental sciences division of the Chinese Academy of Science; India's animal rights champion Ambika Shukla; CEO and Chairperson of the Global Environment Facility (GEF) Dr. Naoko Ishii; former San Francisco mayor Gavin Newsom, architect/philosopher Paolo Soleri; and Denis Hayes, director of the original national Earth Day in 1970 and keynote for the first Ecocity Conference.

The 2015 Summit will take place in Abu Dhabi, United Arab Emirates in October 2015.

Ecocity Conferences:

- 2015 Abu Dhabi, UAE
- 2013 Nantes, France
- 2011 Montreal, Canada
- 2009 Istanbul, Turkey
- 2008 San Francisco, USA
- 2006 Bangalore, India
- 2002 Shenzhen, China
- 2000 Curitiba, Brazil
- 1996 Yoff, Senegal
- 1992 Adelaide, Australia
- 1990 Berkeley, USA

== Sources ==
- EcoCities: Rebuilding Cities in Balance with Nature. Richard Register. New Society Publishers, Oct 18, 2013
- “Ecocities of Tomorrow: An Interview with Richard Register.” Jesse Fox. Treehugger, February 14, 2008; Accessed October 1, 2014. http://www.treehugger.com/sustainable-product-design/ecocities-of-tomorrow-an-interview-with-richard-register.html
- “Ecocity Berkeley: Building Cities for a Healthy Future.” Richard Register. North Atlantic Books, 1987.
- “Resilience in Ecology and Urban Design: Linking Theory and Practice for Sustainable Cities.” S.T.A. Pickett, M.L. Cadenasso, Brian McGrath. Springer Science & Business Media, Jan 13, 2013
