= Inclusive Development Index =

The Inclusive Development Index (IDI) is an annual economic index introduced by the World Economic Forum System Initiative on Shaping the Future of Economic Progress in 2017. The IDI ranks countries' economic performance in three pillars: growth and development, inclusion, and intergenerational equity and sustainability. This initiative aims to inform and enable sustained and inclusive economic progress through deepened public-private cooperation through thought leadership and analysis, strategic dialogue and concrete cooperation, including the acceleration of social impact through corporate action.

In the IDI, countries are given a score from 1 to 7. The greater inclusivity, the higher the score. According to 2018 IDI, the leading economy is Norway, with 6.08, followed by Iceland (6.07) and Luxembourg (also 6.07).

Unlike the gross domestic product (GDP), the IDI measures "...the level and rate of improvement in shared socioeconomic progress".

== See also ==
- Commitment to Development Index
- Human Development Index
- Inclusive growth
- Smart growth
