= Climate change in the United Arab Emirates =

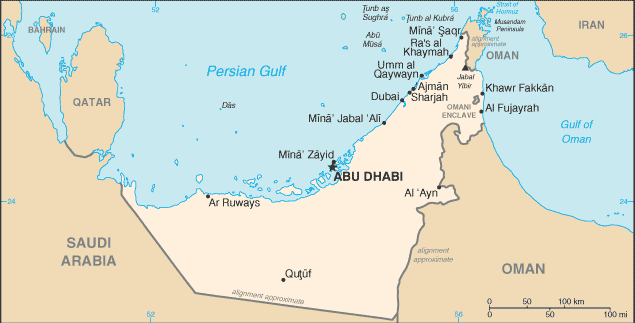
Map of United Arab Emirates

The United Arab Emirates (UAE) faces the impacts of climate change such as water stress, rising sea levels, dust storms, desertification and extreme heat. Climate change threatens the country's water resources, wetland ecosystems, human health, economic stability, and international affairs. The UAE has a hot desert climate and is located on the coast of the Persian Gulf and the Gulf of Oman. Decreasing annual precipitation levels and increased desertification make the country's rural and urban populations vulnerable. Climate change is projected to increase national vulnerabilities in the United Arab Emirates. Sea level rise is expected to impact the UAE's urban infrastructure and marine and wetland ecosystems. The agricultural, fishery, and tourism sectors in the UAE are at risk due to the negative effects of climate change.

UAE has signed and ratified the Paris Treaty. It has revised its third Nationally Determined Contributions, submitted in 2023, focus on both mitigation and adaptation strategies. The UAE intends to reduce its greenhouse gas (GHG) emissions for the year 2030 by 40%.

== Greenhouse gas emissions ==
The UAE's total greenhouse gas emissions in 2005 were approximately 161.134 Mt CO_{2} equivalent. As of 2021, the country had one of the world's top 10 highest per capita CO_{2} emission rates, at 21.8 tons per capita. As part of the energy sector, the oil and gas industry is a significant driver of the economy along with greenhouse gas emissions. The UAE is one of the highest producers and exporters of oil and gas globally and relies on fossil fuels for the country's electric power. In 2012, the country supplied 3.2 million barrels of oil per day in production. The UAE's rapid urbanization and population increase have contributed to the country's high per capita energy consumption, one of the highest in the world as of 2016. The UAE's energy sector contributes 90% of the country's GHG emissions. The sector for road operations and construction contributes anywhere from 76 to 1100 kg CO_{2}e/m^{2} per year, depending on the road networks analyzed.

Energy efficiency and renewable energy efforts allow for the reduction of GHG emissions for the UAE. The work towards lower GHG emissions could lower the health risks for the country's already vulnerable population. The UAE's Energy Strategy 2050 plan includes adjustments in the country's reliance on fossil fuels in the energy sector, using "clean coal" in the transition to clean energy. The Energy Strategy 2050 aims to focus on solar energy to diversify the energy sector along with nuclear power.

== Impacts on the natural environment ==
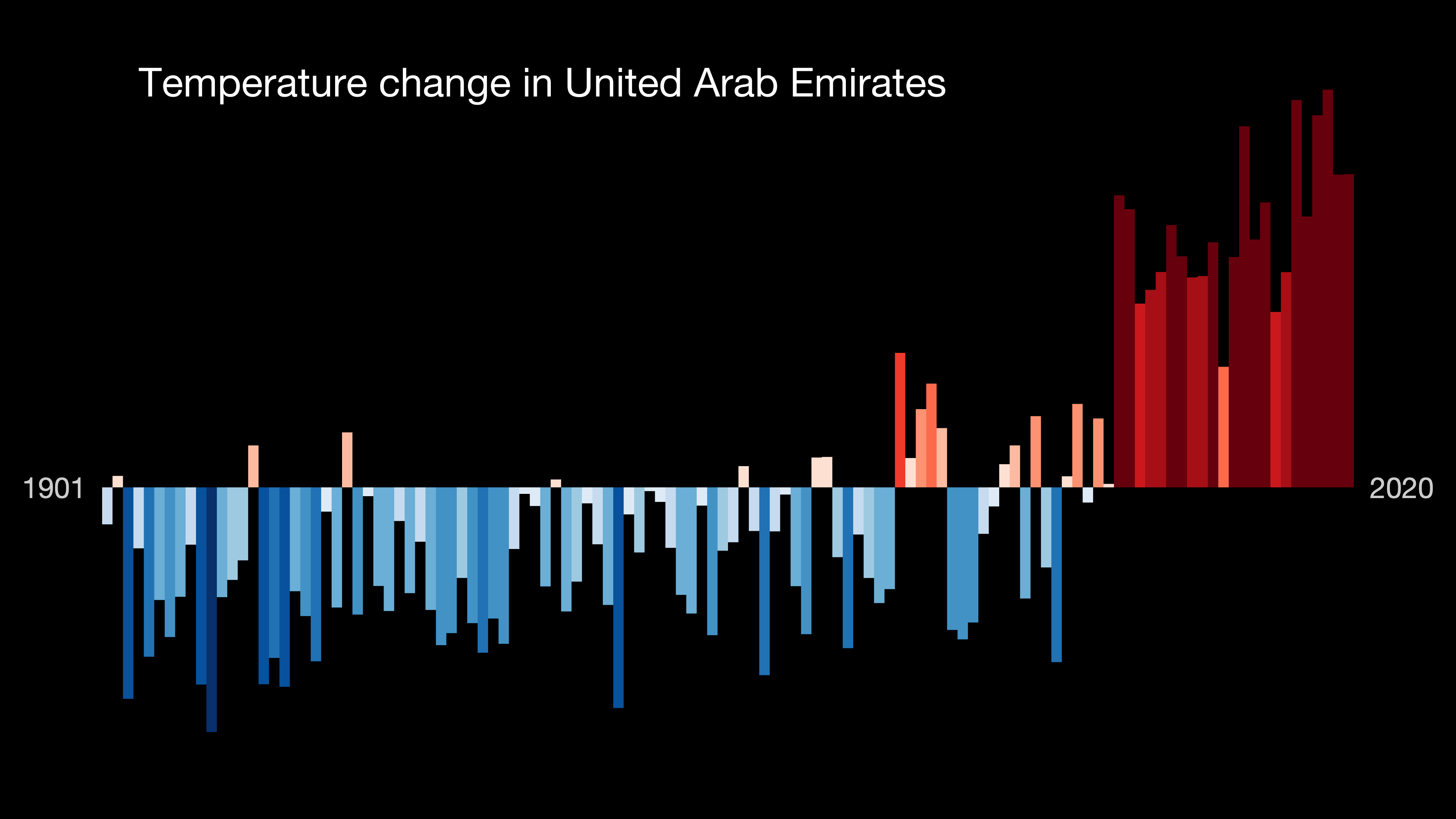
Temperature change in United Arab Emirates (1901–2021)

=== Temperature and weather changes ===
The UAE faces increased temperatures and a drier climate due to climate change. Using Standardized Temperature Index modeling, Abu Dhabi is expected to have the highest mean temperature when compared with Al-Ain, Dubai and Sharjah. All major cities in the country are expected to have increased annual temperatures, and Al-Ain is predicted to have severe heat events in models until 2030. Between 1975 and 2013 Dubai saw a 2.7 °C increase in temperature. The Arabian Gulf's ocean surface temperature has increased in the last 50 years by 0.2 °C to 0.6 °C every 10 years. Sea temperatures are rising, along with ocean acidification, leading to high vulnerabilities for marine life and coastal ecosystems in the area and globally. The industries of fishing and agriculture are vulnerable due to increasing temperatures and weather changes such as drought and extreme heat waves, suggesting populations are at risk to food insecurity and regional food shortages.

=== Water resources ===
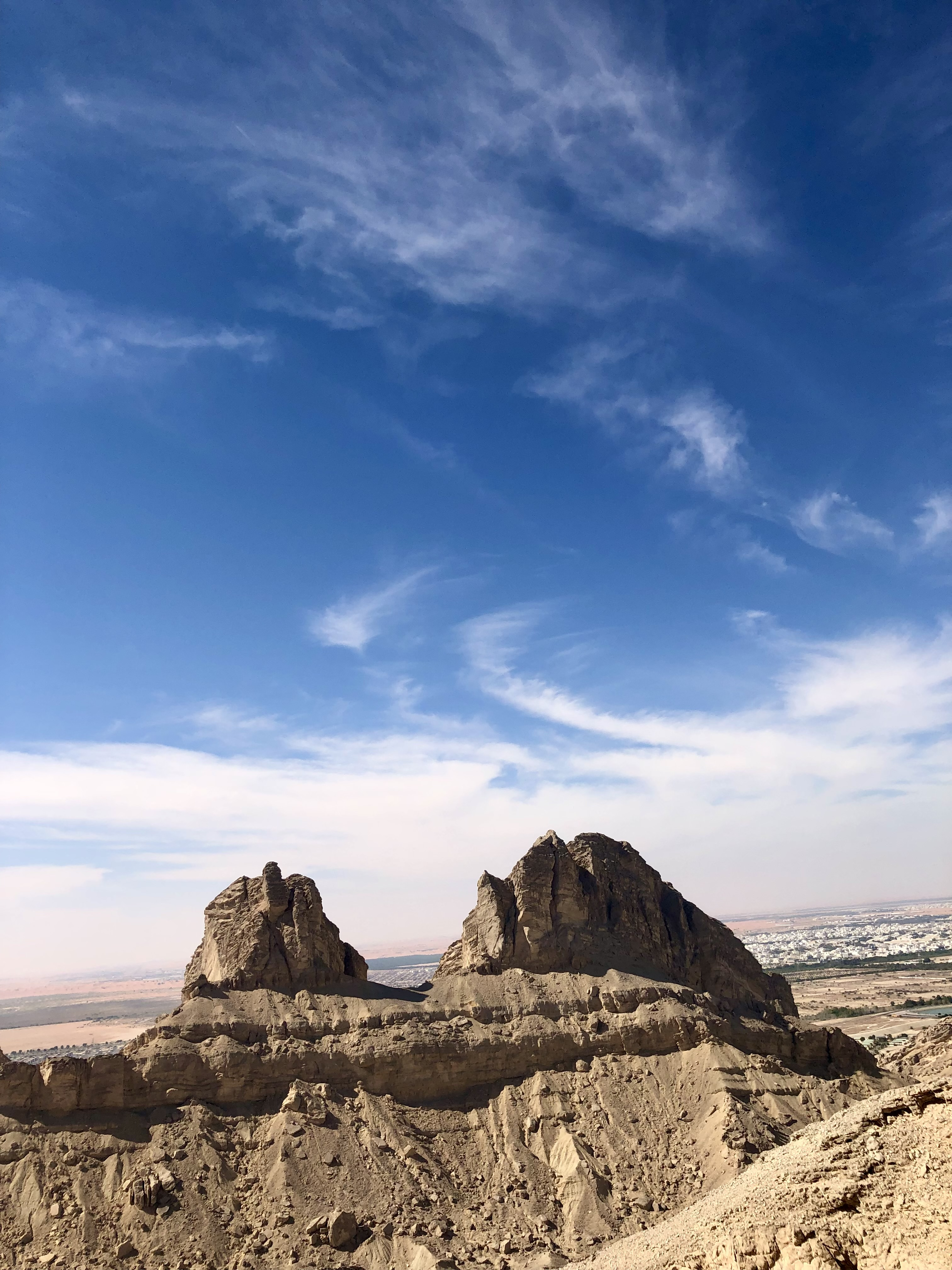
Hafeet Mountain, Al Ain, UAE

Water quality, quantity and availability will be effected due to climate change in the Middle East region. Salinity, extreme heat, drought, and overuse of water resources are factors that impact the population's water resources. Agricultural and industrial use of water resources increases annually while population and population density increases in the UAE. Each emirate in the country has differing household water consumption data depending on economic growth and population. Rapid growth in population throughout the country will increase the strain on irrigation resources, as the UAE has focused water resources on agriculture. The city of Al Ain has at high risk of water scarcity, due to lack of water management and consumption by economic development and agriculture. It is the only city in the UAE with a known source of renewable groundwater. The UAE is at high risk of water scarcity due to the limited sources of groundwater available. The current depletion rate of groundwater could lead to stopped groundwater supply to croplands in 2030, as the demand for water resources for food growth grows with the population. Groundwater sources where available have high salinity and sea level rise will increase salinity, decreasing the quality of the water source in the region. Increasing temperatures and the decrease in annual rainfall will lead to increased consumption in the industrial and agricultural sectors as well as individual consumption for human health needs and the production of food crops.

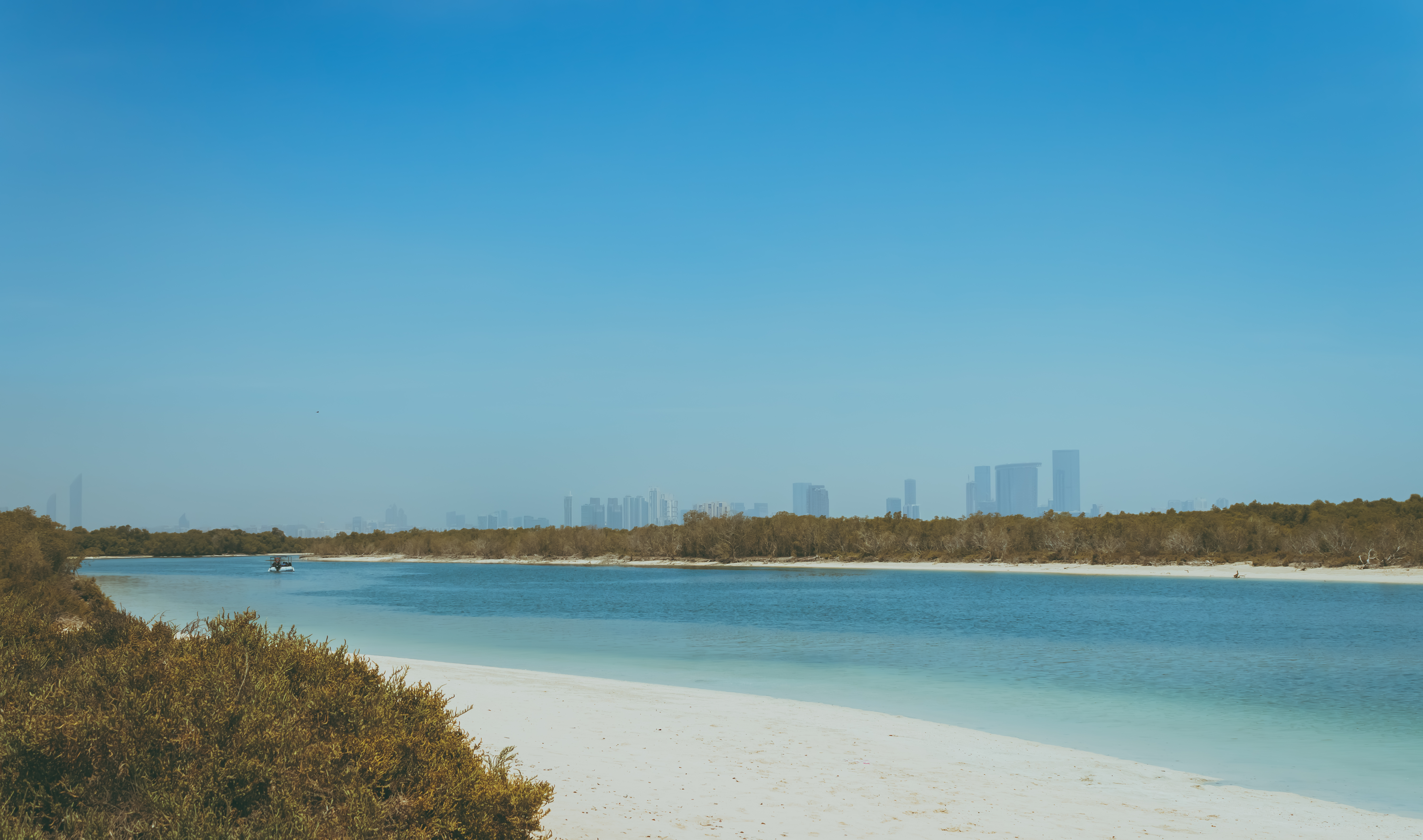
Mangrove National Park, Abu Dhabi city.

=== Ecosystems ===
Marine ecosystems and habitats are threatened by climate change. Mangrove forests, coral reefs, salt marshes and grasses are at risk due to salinization, sea level rise, increased air and ocean temperatures, and changes in precipitation patterns. Damage to such ecosystems will decrease biodiversity in the Arab region and UAE's coastline. The extreme weather events, desertification and flooding are expected to decrease biodiversity and threaten habitat. Mangrove forests are important carbon sequestration ecosystems and support regional biodiversity. There are regional efforts to protect wetland habitats including mangroves with initiatives such as the UAE Annual Mangrove Soil Carbon Sequestration Project which provides data on climate change's effects on carbon sequestration and habitat loss. These projects allow for mitigation and the conservation of vulnerable habitat.

=== Sea level rise ===
The population of Arabian Gulf countries is concentrated near the coast, with 26 million people living in areas concierge coastal zones. However, the UAE is particularly vulnerable, because the low-lying coastline is shallow sloping, which makes the country highly susceptible to flooding. The countries have also built 90% of the infrastructure within several meters of sea level and 85% of their population lives within several meters of sea level, including the coastal city of Dubai. The 1300-kilometer coastline hosts tourism, ports, residential housing, and ongoing construction for development. 13.8% of the total UAE coastline has very high coastal vulnerability to sea level rise. Sea level is predicted to rise between 42 and 98 cm by the year 2100. By 2100, Six percent of the UAE coastline is predicted to be under water. Sea level rise is expected to increase environmental disaster risk, including coastal flooding, increased erosion, storm surge, salination of groundwater (a source of drinking water for UAE), and environmental damage to ecosystems. The most vulnerable areas in the UAE span from the middle of Dubai city's coast to Umm Al Quwain to Ras Al-Khaimah. UAE coastal areas on the Gulf of Oman and the Persian Gulf are at high risk of sea level rise. The eastern coast in the Gulf of Oman has a high vulnerability to sea level rise, while the western side of the UAE coast is less vulnerable but still at risk.

== Impacts on People ==
=== Economic impacts ===
Climate change and sea level rise are expected to have a severe impact on the UAE's coastline, where the country holds its tourism and development for revenue. The country's coastal cities hold large populations of people, where large areas of its built environment are at high risk of sea level rise and other environmental hazards from climate change. The UAE's agriculture, fisheries and aquaculture, tourism, and health are vulnerable to the effects of climate change. Strains on water resources and food production will increase UAE's reliance on food imports and economic development to protect the country's people and natural environment. Sustainable development is an economic route that will strengthen the UAE's continuing development while limiting the country's emissions and outputs to worsen the impacts of climate change. As part of the UAE's mitigation plans, the country is implementing economic diversification to support its economy to address the strains from climate change.

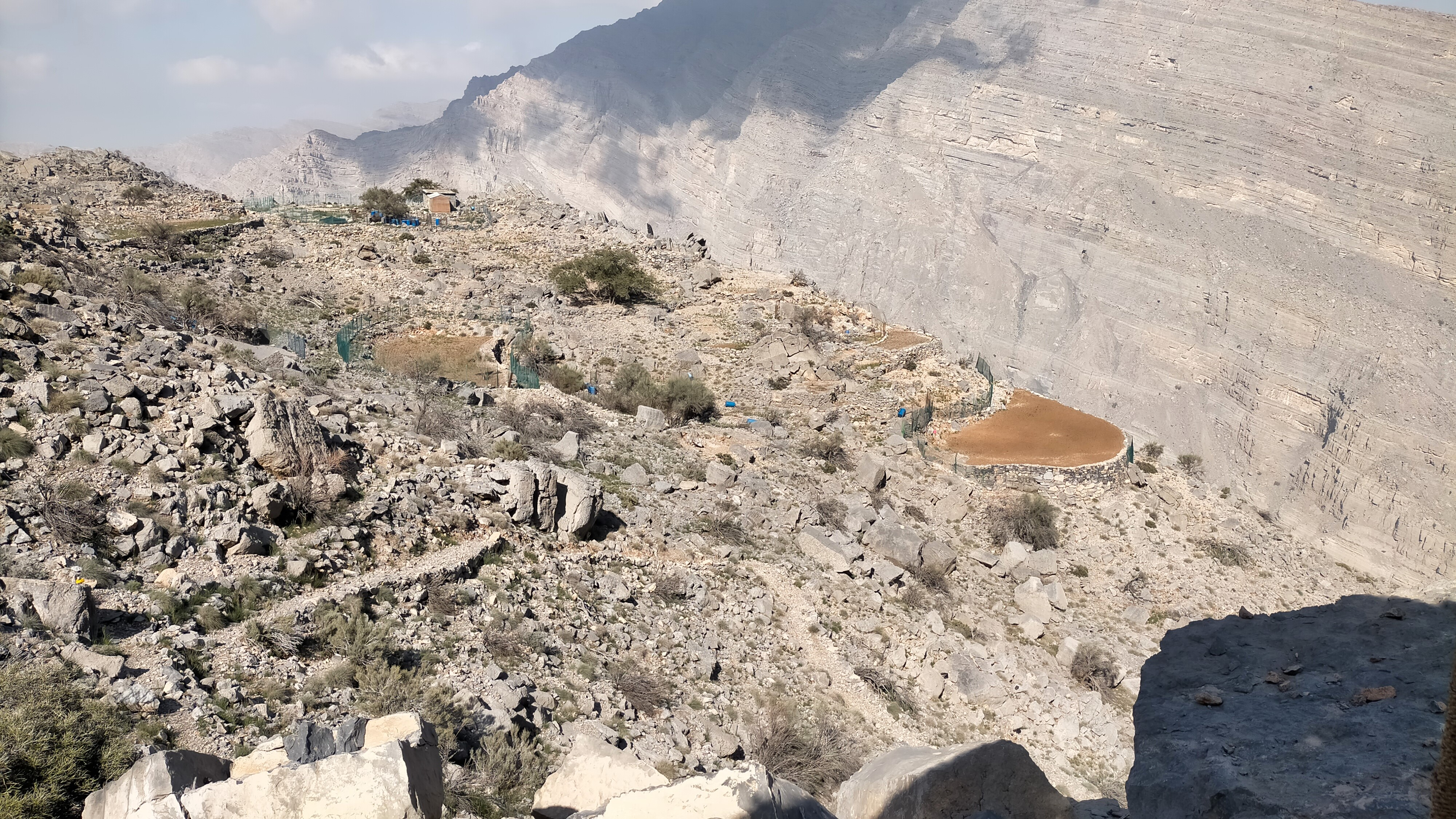
Farms and terraces in the Wadi Litibah region of UAE.

=== Agriculture ===
The Arid climate and poor soil health make it difficult to form a robust agriculture sector, however, they have still made developments. The UAE's lack of rainfall and natural waterways has led to many of the farms, drawing from underground aquifers for water. There are 160,000 hectares of cultivable land being used in the UAE, with the majority of that land being taken up by date palms. In total, there are around 30,000 farms within the UAE, and the government grants 50% subsidies on seeds, fertilizers, and pesticides.

The UAE has looked to develop urban farms that implement rooftop farming, hydroponics, aquaponics, vertical farming, and aeroponics. As there is a high demand to eat local produce over imports. In more conventional farms the UAE has looked to replace outdated flood irrigation systems with more modern water-conserving irrigation. There has also been an increased transition, from more traditional farms to organic farms, which have a more sustainable approach, there are approximately 50 organic farms in the UAE. The Abu Dhabi Agriculture and Food Safety Authority (ADAFSA) launched a program to establish a gene bank, to ensure that certain crop genes are saved and can be drawn upon in the future. The UAE has also planned to include agriculture in their tourism sector, as they feel there is interest in their organic farms and camel milk industry. Overall the UAE has used innovative solutions to try and maximize food production in their climate, by modernizing their farms to be in a controlled environment and bolstering their traditional farms to be water efficient.

People's reliance on the coastal and marine environment centers most of the income for large populations in UAE. The impacts of climate change threaten the population's income, livelihood, and health.

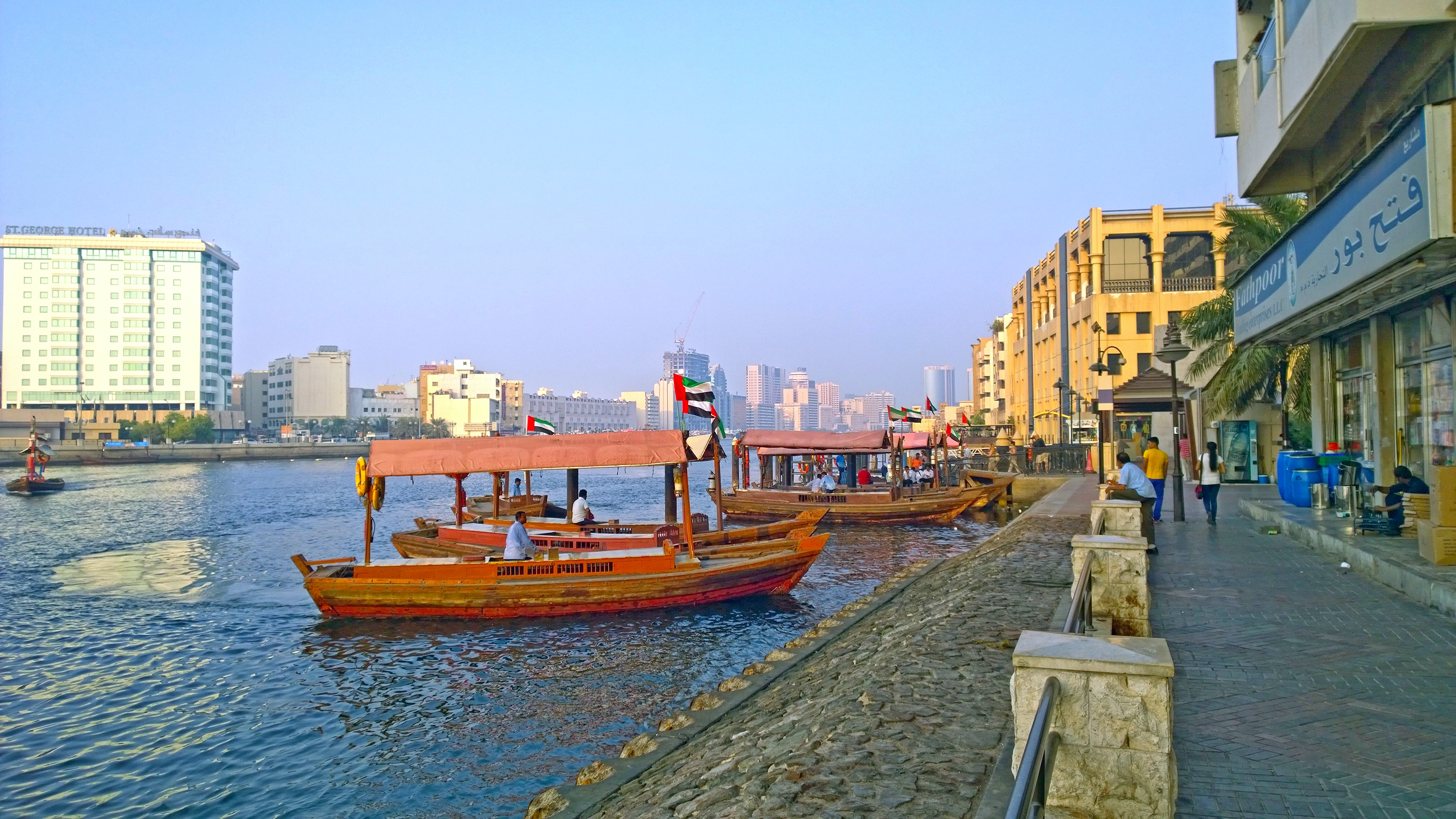
Tourism in Dubai, UAE.

=== Tourism ===
Tourism in the UAE has been one of the fastest-growing sectors of the country's economy, as in the last year the sector grew by 26%, making up 11% of the country's overall GDP. The country's unique climate, state-of-the-art buildings, and many hotels make it an ideal destination for visitors. However, climate change can potentially deter future visitors, as tourist infrastructure (hotels, housing, and restaurants) is built in areas vulnerable to rising sea levels. In particular, Palm Island, three artificially made islands off the coast of Dubai, had the goal of accommodating luxury housing and around 80 hotels. This project has been deemed a failure as it has eroded the natural coastline, as 5.5 million cubic meters of rock were quarried with an astronomical carbon footprint. Therefore, the project is already being built on top of their natural shoreline, so as climate change raises the sea level in Dubai, Palm Island will be the most vulnerable location. The rising temperatures will shorten the tourist season in the UAE, as many visitors will avoid Dubai during the shoulder months—those transitional periods between the intense summer heat and the peak winter season when temperatures are more comfortable for outdoor activities. There are also popular tourist areas that will be damaged because of the effects of climate change: in particular, coral bleaching will occur, as the sea temperature rises. There are also predictions that the cost of visiting the UAE will increase, as the emirates rely so much on air conditioning in their shopping centers and restaurants; when temperature rises, it will only increase the cost of air conditioning, which will in turn raise the price of goods and services.

=== Health ===
As climate change is expected to increase the average annual temperature, that will increase the likelihood of UAE being exposed to some type of heat stress. Particularly during times of heat waves (Prolonged periods of extreme heat) vulnerable populations; people over the age of 65 or people working outside, can die or face heat exhaustion (WHO, 2024). Many of the drivers of climate change, energy production, transportation, and pollution, can decrease the overall air quality in the UAE. In the U.S., dust is the main contributor to deteriorating air quality as in all UAE cities, Annual mean PM2.5 levels were significantly higher than the global mean (WHO, 2024).

== Mitigation ==
The UAE has developed mitigation practices to equip the country for increased sea level rise, salinization of freshwater, and decarbonization. Tools and technologies used to project future precipitation, weather, and storm patterns are crucial to future climate change mitigation, adaptation, and resource management for the UAE. With prediction tools such as statistical downscaling, precipitation and temperature patterns are localized to meet the needs of specific regions of the UAE.

Previous UAE projects focused on regional and international mitigation efforts include the Abu Dhabi Blue Carbon Demonstration Project, prior to the UAE's mangrove sequestration project. The Ministry of Climate Change and Environment (MOCCAE) and the Abu Dhabi Global Environmental Data Initiative (AGEDI) partnered in 2019 to understand the benefits of 'Blue Carbon' ecosystems, including mangroves and other coastal environments, for the nation of UAE. Commissioned by AGEDI, the UAE Annual Mangrove Soil Carbon Sequestration Project is a continued study conducted in UAE measuring the rate of carbon sequestration, or removal of carbon from the atmosphere, through mangroves.

The UAE's mangrove ecosystems provide high levels of carbon sequestration, storage in its biomass in an arid region, and overall climate mitigation. Mangroves at Khor Kalba were shown to sequester 0.5 tons of carbon per hectare per year. This study provides data to manage coastal planning and continue conservation efforts for mangrove ecosystems. The use of the term 'Blue Carbon' indicates ecosystems that have the ability to sequester or store carbon and include wetlands: mangrove forests, seagrasses, and salt marshes. The mangrove study provided localized data collection at multiple locations.

Decarbonization efforts and goals including the Net Zero 2050 Strategic Initiative expect to align with social and economic goals for UAE's people, and increased opportunities while the country divests in its fossil fuel economy. In the delivery of the UAE Consensus at COP28, plans suggested a full transition from fossil fuels in the energy sector to support the net zero goal by 2050.

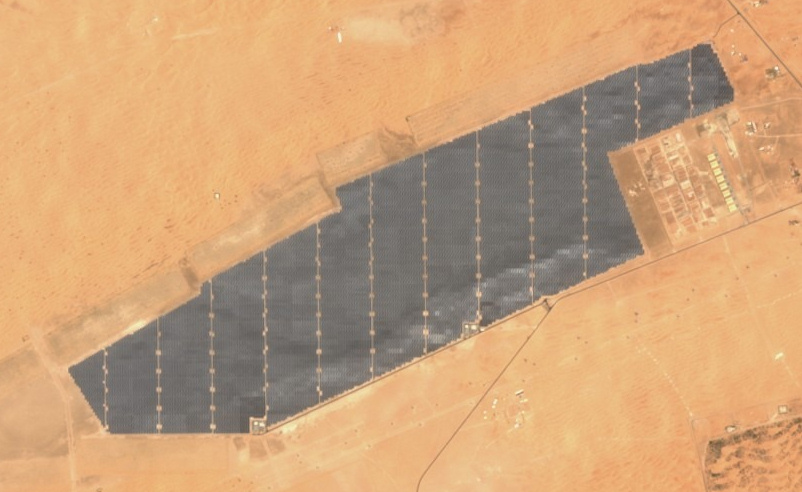
Noor Abu Dhabi Solar Power Plant

== Adaptation ==
The country's national climate adaptation policy was developed beginning in 2017, as part of the UAE's Climate Plan. Current warming patterns and the effects of climate change are present today, and the UAE is adapting ongoing initiatives to incorporate a climate change lens. Adaptation and resilience measures are expected to include localized plans for the country, focusing on the improvement of climate change data, health and education, financial well-being, and healthy ecosystems. As part of the Local, National, and Regional Climate Change Program (LNRCCP) of AGEDI, regional climate change modeling addressed the future impacts of greenhouse gas emissions and linked the energy, water, and health sectors together in potential climate change initiatives for societal improvement for vulnerable populations within UAE.

The UAE's Sustainable Development Goals (SDGs) include a transition to greener energy that is affordable, citing solar cells, enhanced wind turbines, and bioenergy conversion processes as energy sources for the country as it divests from fossil fuels and acts to diversify its energy sector. There is high potential for solar as a main energy source for the UAE, as the country yields high photovoltaic potential with solar power systems in place. The expansion of solar power sites around the country has increased this potential use for the energy sector with sites in place.

The UAE's Net Zero by 2050 Strategic Initiative upholds the Paris Agreement's goals and is the first country in the Middle East to implement a carbon-neutral plan. Expansion of renewable green energy has occurred during the 2020 decade, as the UAE began the country's first program for wind power in October 2023. The renewable energy capacity of the country increased by nearly 70% between 2022 and 2023. The Ministry of Climate Change and Environment is working with government bodies at all levels to ensure the reduction of total carbon emissions, the sectors of power/energy, agriculture, transportation, and infrastructure being the top priorities. As part of Dubai's contribution to the UAE's energy transition efforts, the Mohammed bin Rashid Al Maktoum Solar Park is being constructed to have a capacity of 5,000 MW by 2030. It is the largest solar power park in the world and it is expected to save 6.5 million tons carbon emissions each year once completed.

The UAE government initiated the Masdar City project in 2006, with the state-owned enterprise Mubadala Development Company beginning development with a US$22 billion budget. Masdar City is intended to be a zero-carbon, zero-waste community with no negative environmental impact.

== Society and culture ==
=== Public Perception and Activism ===
Youth empowerment efforts have been made by university groups in the UAE, including the Mohamed Bin Zayed University for Humanities. Environmental education is a form of activism implemented in schools globally, which instills environmental consciousness and promotes participation in national and regional discussions around climate change and solutions to address it. One hundred and fifty youth participated in programming at COP28 in Dubai, engaging in international environmental advocacy. The UAE Ministry of Climate Change and Environment has partnered with universities to support youth environmental education and activism. Environmental journalism supports activism in the UAE, while press and media coverage of environmental projects are maintained by the governing body and monarchy of the UAE, as most news organizations are state owned.

=== International cooperation ===
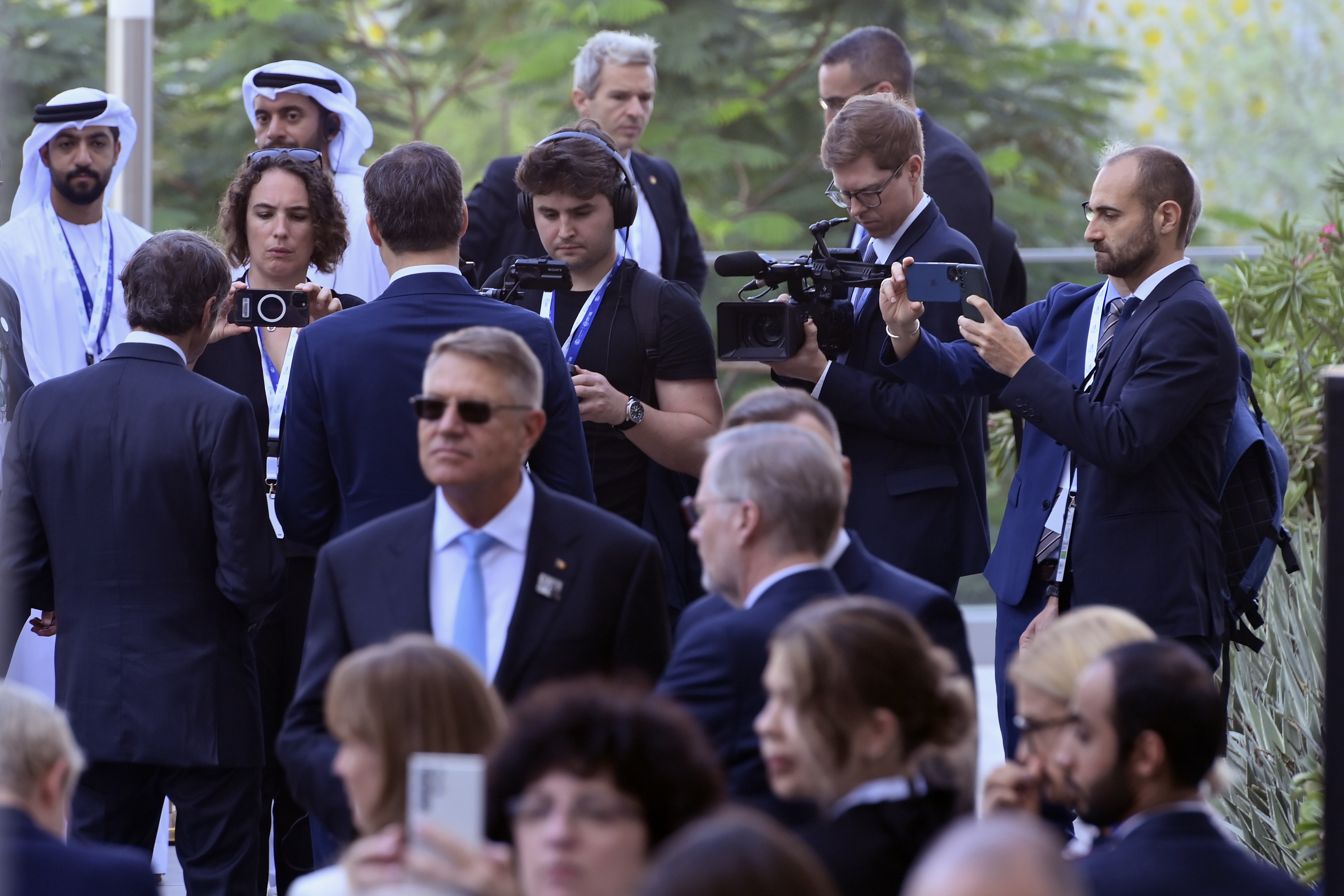
Net Zero Nuclear Event at COP 28, the United Nations Climate Change Conference 2023.

In 1975, the UAE Supreme Committee of Environment (SCE) was formed, marking the beginning of UAE environmental policy. The UAE hosted the Conference of the Parties for its 28th year, COP28, in 2023. Dr. Sultan Al Jaber stood as COP28 president, making welcoming and closing remarks at the conference. He is head of the Abu Dhabi National Oil Company and minister of industry and advanced technology of the United Arab Emirates.

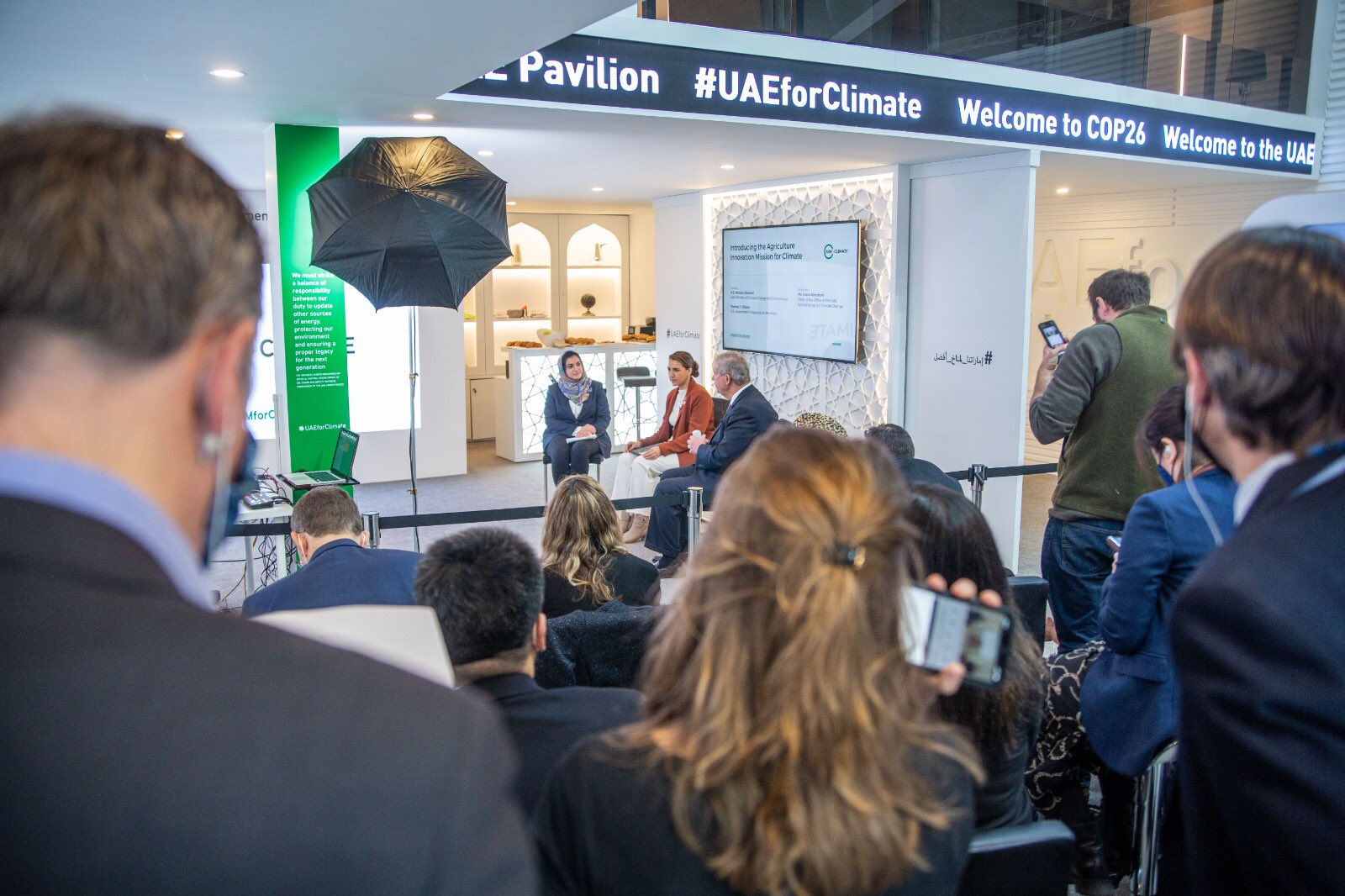
Hunger and climate change discussions at COP 26.

The UAE has supported the Sustainable Development Goals (SDGs) from the 2015 United Nations Sustainable Development Summit. Starting in 2020 the Paris Agreement began overseeing climate commitments and actions made by the UAE as part of the growing international commitment to lowering the impacts of climate change and greenhouse gas emissions. The Mohamed Bin Zayed Water Initiative serves as a group focused on the issue of water scarcity for global populations. The UAE has called for international cooperation to improve water accessibility with the Mohamed Min Zayed Water Initiative. This initiative supports desalination efforts to increase water access, affordability, and reliability while being sustainable.
