= Yara International =

Norwegian chemical company

Coordinates: 59°54′52.70″N 10°42′54.15″E

Yara International ASA
- Type: Allmennaksjeselskap
- Traded as: OSE: YAR; OBX component
- Industry: Chemicals
- Founded: 1905
- Headquarters: Oslo, Norway
- Key people: Svein Tore Holsether (President and CEO), Leif Teksum (Chairman)
- Products: Nitrogen fertilizers, nitrates
- Revenue: ▲NOK 2.322 Billion (Fiscal Year Ended 31 December 2020)
- Operating income: ▼ –NOK 1.226 Billion (Fiscal Year Ended 31 December 2020)
- Net income: 14,128,000,000 Norwegian krone
- Total assets: ▲NOK 83.561 Billion (Fiscal Year Ended 31 December 2020)
- Total equity: ▲NOK 16.711 Billion (Fiscal Year Ended 31 December 2020)
- Number of employees: 17,000 (end 2020)
- Website: www.yara.com

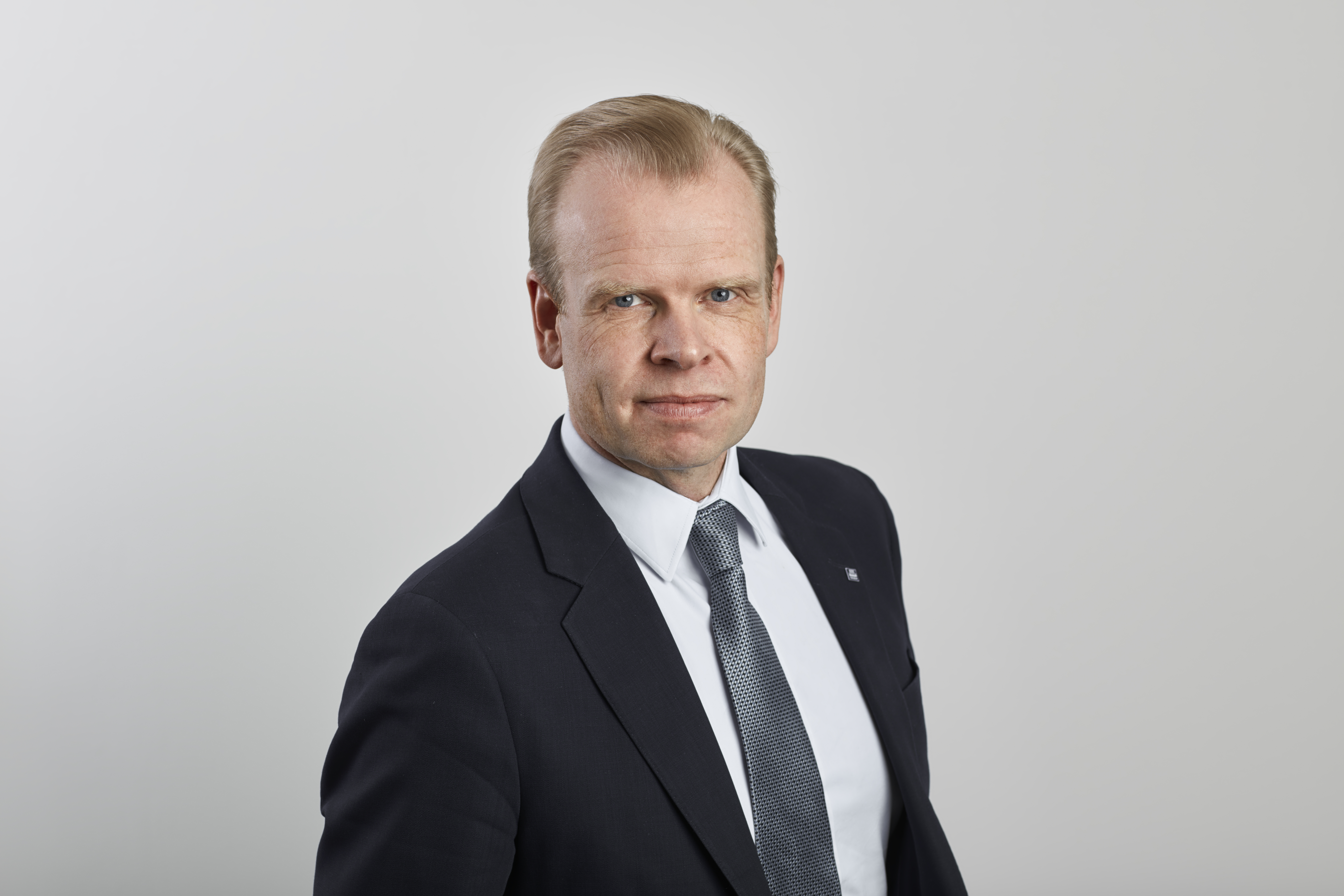
Svein Tore Holsether, President and CEO of Yara International ASA

Yara International ASA is a Norwegian chemical company. It produces, distributes, and sells nitrogen-based mineral fertilizers and related industrial products. Its product line also includes phosphate and potash-based mineral fertilizers, as well as complex and specialty mineral fertilizer products.

The company was established in 1905 as Norsk Hydro — the world's first producer of mineral nitrogen fertilizers — and de-merged as Yara International ASA on 25 March 2004. Yara is listed on the Oslo Stock Exchange and has its headquarters in Oslo. The company has more than 17,000 employees, production sites on six continents, operations in more than 60 countries and sales to about 150 countries.

The Norwegian government owns more than a third of Yara and is its largest shareholder.

== History ==
=== 1900–1919 ===
The history of Yara dates back to the establishment of Norsk hydroelektiske kvelstoffaktieselskab, or Norsk Hydro, as it later became known, in December 1905 after nitrogen fertilizer was successfully produced at Notodden. Norsk Hydro was founded by Sam Eyde, Kristian Birkeland, and Marcus Wallenberg Sr.. In 1903, Birkeland and Eyde had developed direct nitrogen fixation, called the Birkeland–Eyde process, based on a method used by Henry Cavendish in 1784.

The company used Norway's large hydroelectric-energy resources to produce its first product. Between 1906 and 1919 Norsk Hydro built two hydroelectric power plants in Notodden and Rjukan. The company sent its first shipment to China in 1913.

=== 1960–1977 ===
Following the successful production of mineral fertilizer, the company expanded into other businesses such as oil and metals. In 1969, Norsk Hydro entered into its first joint venture, with authorities in Qatar. With access to a competitive source of gas and a strategic location in the Middle East, the joint venture opened up a global market for the company.

Norsk Hydro was led by Johan Berthin Holte as CEO from 1967 until 1977. By the 1970s, the company was established in Asia, the Middle East and North America. The late 1970s to the mid-1980s was a period of rapid growth, through the acquisition of major fertilizer companies in France, Germany, the Netherlands and the United Kingdom. At the end of the 1990s, the company was also established in Brazil (through the acquisition of Adubos Trevo) and South Africa.

=== 2004–2008 ===
In 2004, Hydro Agri de-merged from Norsk Hydro and became an independent company called Yara International ASA. The company was listed on the Oslo Stock Exchange on 25 March 2004 and is a leading producer of ammonia, nitrates, nitrogen products, and NPK specialty fertilizers. Since then, Yara has continued to expand its global presence through investments in other countries, with many acquisitions, joint ventures, and new projects, primarily in Africa and North and South America.

In July 2006 Yara paid $126 million for a controlling share in Fertibras. This acquisition gave Yara more than 99% of the voting stock in Fertibras and 15% of Fosfertil, the largest producer in Brazil of nitrogen and phosphate fertilizers.

=== 2008–2014 ===
In 2008, Thorleif Enger retired, and Jørgen Ole Haslestad became CEO. On his appointment, Haslestad stated: "Yara must continue its growth strategy. The company has many exciting opportunities to pursue, for instance when it comes to the environment, where we contribute to better balance in agricultural development and deliver some interesting industrial solutions to environmental problems." Haslestad held the office until 2014, when the company fired him, saying they needed someone who could complete the upcoming merger negotiations and that Haslestad had been on the point of retiring. Svein Richard Brandtzaeg ten days earlier had decided not to leave Hydro to take over the helm of Yara, after contract negotiations were leaked and charges were laid against Enger, the prior CEO.

In January 2010, Yara reached an agreement with Vale to sell its Brazilian shares of Fosfertil for $785 million US. Also in 2010, ANZ Bank called in the receivers on the 65% share of Burrup owned by Pankaj and Radhika Oswal, which was later sold to Yara and to Apache Corporation of New York, which had a gas supply agreement with Burrup. In 2016 the Oswals' were still litigating the fairness of the proceedings, alleging coercion. Radhika has also been accused of dodging a $186 million tax bill. Also in separate proceedings, her husband is alleged to have taken more than $150 million from entities associated with the fertiliser plant and to have spent the money on private planes and other luxury goods. The two left Perth for Dubai in 2010.

On 25 February 2011, the US Treasury Department lifted sanctions that had been in place against Yara subsidiary Libyan Norwegian Fertilizer because of its affiliation with the Libyan government.

In March 2011, the Dutch government froze about €3 billion in Libyan assets, including Yara's Sluiskil joint venture, half-owned by the LIA and the NOCL On 3 August 2011, Yara announced that it was selling its share in its Russian Rossosh NPK plant for $390 million US, or 2.1 billion kroner (NOK). Norwegian authorities had been informed by the company in 2011 that it might have been involved in corruption in connection with 2008 negotiations leading to 2009's investment of 1.5 billion Norwegian kroner into a 50% share of Libyan Norwegian Fertiliser Company, or LIFECO.

In 2013, Yara was embroiled in a scandal that involved many companies and transactions that may not have taken place. Dagens Næringsliv, Norway's business daily, reported that Yara had paid over eight million Norwegian krone to Shukri Ghanem, formerly Libya's prime minister, oil minister, and senior commander of the state oil company. Ghanem had been found dead in the Austrian Danube in 2012. Yara issued fictitious invoices to account for the money transfers, which were deposited in the bank account of a relative of Ghanem in the UBS Bank in Switzerland. The Norwegian (Økokrim) anti-corruption agency noticed the payments in 2011. The head of the upstream segment, Tor Halba, had warned of possible corrupt practices in a 2008 internal email. Investigators came across the payments when they seized business records for two Swiss-based businesses, one of them Yara's fertilizer trading subsidiary, Balderton. Yara's own investigation uncovered additional corruption in India. Økokrim charged the company with gross corruption in both cases.

On 26 October 2013, Yara acquired OFD Holding Inc.(OFD) from Omimex Resources Inc. for US$425 million, gaining production facilities in Colombia and distribution companies across Latin America.

In January 2014, the corporation agreed to pay a $48 million fine in a case involving corruption between 2004 and 2009. The company admitted bribing senior government officials in India and Libya, as well as to suppliers in Russia and India. The fine was the largest ever of its kind in Norway. The case puts two cohorts of Yara executives up against each other.

On 10 January 2014, the Norwegian Cabinet approved the indictment of former deputy CEO Daniel Clauw in connection with Norway's investigation of Yara. Three other Yara executives were also indicted in the case. They were sentenced 7 July 2015. Enger, the former CEO, received the harshest sentence, three years. The former chief legal officer, Kendrick Wallace, was given a 2½-year sentence, and Clauw and former upstream coordinator Tor Halba were given two-year sentences. Yara International announced in September 2014 that it was in talks with CF Industries about a possible merger of equals, a deal worth over $27 billion.

=== 2015 to present ===
In Zambia, Yara acquired Greenbelt Fertilizers, a company with a strong footprint in Zambia, Mozambique and Malawi. In September 2015, Svein Tore Holsether joined Yara as the company's new president and CEO. In 2015, the last Yara Prize was awarded before it was turned into the Africa Food Prize. The prize was launched in 2005. From 2016 and onwards, the Yara Prize has been turned into the Africa Food Prize, in collaboration with Alliance for a Green Revolution in Africa (AGRA).

In February 2016 the two urea and two ammonia plants Yara has in Brega were operating at less than 50% of their capacity.

In 2017, Yara ordered the Yara Birkeland, which will be the world's first autonomous ship. Entering service in 2018, it will be fully autonomous by 2020.

In connection with the protests in Belarus in 2020, the opposition politician Sviatlana Tsikhanouskaya called Yara International to stop working with Belarusian state-owned company Belaruskali or to ensure that they respect workers' rights. The state-owned company Belaruskali had previously fired employees who had taken part in strikes or demonstrations. In the course of this, Yara published a statement in which they called on the Belarusian state company to stop punishing workers. In the same year, Yara International partnered with the energy company EnergyNest AS to integrate a 4MWh thermal energy storage unit in their facility in Porsgrunn, Norway.

In 2025, the company announced the development of new alternative fuel technologies for maritime transport using ammonia to reduce greenhouse gas emissions.

The company became a key beneficiary of the EU tariffs imposed on Russian fertilizers, increasing its net profit more than fivefold. As a result, it has repeatedly been accused of behind-the-scenes lobbying in Brussels, which critics say contributed to rising fertilizer prices and pushed many European farmers to the brink of bankruptcy.

== Acquisitions, joint ventures and expansions ==
- 30% of the Russian fertilizer producer OAO Minudobreniya ("Rossosh"), bought in February 2005.
- In April 2006, an ammonia plant opened in Burrup, Australia. Yara was involved in litigation with the other original share-holder, Pankaj Oswal.
- In July 2006, Yara bought a controlling interest in the Brazilian fertilizer distribution and marketing company Fertibras.
- In September 2006, Yara bought 50% of the Geneva-based trading company Balderton Fertilisers SA.
- In May 2007, Yara bought 30.05% of Finnish fertilizer company Kemira GrowHow and successfully tendered an offer to buy the rest.
- In August 2007, Yara entered into a joint venture with Wilhelmsen Maritime Services that owned 50% of the Norwegian-registered company Yarwil, which provides emission reduction systems for NOx emissions from ship engines.
- In July 2008, Yara entered into an agreement to acquire Canadian nitrogen producer SaskFerco, completing the deal in October 2008. Afterwards the fertilizer plant located in Belle Plaine began to operate as Yara Belle Plaine Inc.
- 50% of a fertiliser factory in Brega, owned by Yara as a result of its 50% stake in Libyan Norwegian Fertiliser Company (LIFECO). The co-owners of LIFECO are the National Oil Corporation of Libya (NOC) and the Libyan Investment Authority (LIA) — each with 25%. Yara got rid of its stake in LIFECO, at the end of 2020.
- In September 2009, Yara began construction of a new Urea7 factory at Sluiskil, in the Netherlands.
- In October 2009, Qafco, in which Yara has 25% equity interest, signed a letter of intent to build the Qafco-6 expansion project. The project included construction of a urea plant with a total daily production capacity of 3,850 tons.
- In January 2010, Yara acquired the remaining 50% of Balderton Fertilisers.
- In December 2012, Yara acquired Bunge Limited´s fertilizer blending facilities, brands, and warehouses in Brazil. Brazilian antitrust authorities, the Administrative Council for Economic Defense or Conselho Administrativo de Defesa Econômica in Portuguese (CADE), approved the acquisition in May 2013. Yara and Bunge completed the transaction in August 2013.
- In October 2013, Yara acquired the remaining 50% of Yarwil, previously owned by Wilhelmsen Maritime Services through a joint venture with Yara.
- In November 2013, Yara acquired OFD Holding from Omimex Resources Inc. for fertilizer production facilities in Colombia and distribution companies in Colombia, Peru, Mexico, Costa Rica, Panama, and Bolivia. This transaction further strengthened Yara's downstream footprint and growth platform in Latin America and was highly complementary to its recent acquisition of Bunge's fertilizer business in Brazil.

Libyan Norwegian Fertiliser Company B.V., registered in the Netherlands, is co-owned by Yara and "Libyan partners ... with close ties to Muammar Gaddafi and his clan" according to Dagens Næringsliv. Authorities have frozen the joint venture's bank accounts in the Netherlands.

- In 2018, Yara opened a logistics-focused European Business Centre in Vilnius, Lithuania.
- In 2018, Yara opened its Myanmar office, hiring agronomists and commercial employees for its local operations.
- In December 2023, Yara acquired Agribios Italiana, an organic fertilizer business for an undisclosed amount.

== Environmental impact ==
According to the Intergovernmental Panel on Climate Change (IPCC) Special Report on Climate Change and Land, production of fertilizers and associated land use practices are drivers of global warming. As of 2017 Yara was one of the world's biggest producers of synthetic fertilizers and largest industrial buyer of natural gas. The company also lobbies for fracking.

== Chairmen ==
- Leif Teksum (2014—incumbent). Replaced Bernt Reitan after the annual general meeting on 5 May 2014. Teksum oversaw DNB's Swedish and Norwegian portfolio, and headed DNB's Norwegian business market and international operations before becoming Yara's chairman.
- Bernt Reitan (2012–2014) announced in April 2014 that he would not seek another term after May 2014. In September 2012 the election committee of Yara announced that they were unaware that Reitan's former employer, ALCOA was under investigated for corruption by the United States.
- Øivind Lund (2004–2012)

== CEOs ==
- Thorleif Enger 2004–2008
- Jørgen Ole Haslestad
- Torgeir Kvidal 2014–2015
- Svein Tore Holsether 2015—
