= Masdar Institute =

Former university in Abu Dhabi, UAE

Masdar Institute of Science and Technology
- معهد مصدر للعلوم والتكنولوجيا
- Type: Private not-for-profit
- Active: 2007–2017 (merged)
- Academic affiliations: Khalifa University
- Provost: Behjat Al Yousuf (2015)
- Academic staff: 85 (2017)
- Postgraduates: 456 (2017)
- Location: Masdar City, Abu Dhabi, United Arab Emirates; 24°25′57″N 54°37′07″E
- Colours: Light Blue and White

The Masdar Institute of Science and Technology in Masdar City, Abu Dhabi, was a private, higher-education and research institute active from 2007 to 2017, when it merged with two other institutions, namely Petroleum Institute and Khalifa University, to become the multi-campus, sole-branded Khalifa University. Its previous structure, now part of Khalifa University, is now known as the Masdar City campus.

The Masdar Institute was an integral part of the nonprofit side of the Masdar Initiative and was the first institution to occupy Masdar City. The Technology and Development Program at MIT provided scholarly assessment and advice to the Masdar Institute.

== History ==
The Masdar Institute, established on 25 February 2007, was developed by Hip Hing Construction, with the architectural firm Foster and Partners. The first phase of the project was managed by CH2M Hill. As of 2017, it employed 85 faculty members and had an enrollment of 456 students. Its establishment was part of a resource diversification policy for Abu Dhabi, along with Masdar City and the Zayed Future Energy Prize.

The same year, the institute completed a thermal energy storage project with the Norwegian company EnergyNest AS in Abu Dhabi, which was continued for improvement until 2017.

Also in 2017, Masdar merged with the Petroleum Institute and Khalifa University, to become the multi-campus and sole-branded Khalifa University.

== Students ==
By 2017, 456 students were enrolled, and the institute had more than 550 alumni.

== Faculty and research ==
Masdar Institute commenced teaching in September 2009. Its academics conducted research individually and in collaboration with several top-ranked universities, notably MIT, on subjects including water environment and health, advanced energy systems and microsystems, and advanced materials. By 2018, through the MI-MIT collaboration, 8 projects were completed and 11 one-to-one research and 3 flagship projects (larger research teams) were being executed. The collaboration had a scientific outreach that included 201 scientific peer-reviewed journal and book publications and 217 conference papers and presentations by April 2018.
