= EnergyNest =

Norwegian energy storage company

ENERGYNEST AS
- Company type: Private
- Industry: Energy storage
- Founded: 2011
- Headquarters: Billingstad, Norway
- Key people: Alex Robertson (CEO)
- Products: Thermal Battery
- Website: www.energy-nest.com

ENERGYNEST is a thermal energy storage company founded in 2011 by Professor Pål Bergan and Øivind Resch. The company is headquartered in Billingstad, Norway. Other branches are located in Hamburg, Seville, Madrid and Rotterdam.

The company manufactures industrial scale thermal energy storage systems. The thermal battery is designed to store energy in the form of heat and release it as process heat or steam when needed. The use of thermal energy storage enables the decoupling of energy production and energy consumption – and therefore flexible energy use.

The pilot facility project in Masdar City (Abu Dhabi), in cooperation with the Masdar Institute of Science & Technology was completed in 2015, which was continued for improvement until 2017.

The first industrial project started in September 2019, where the company has supplied thermal batteries for the Italian energy company Eni in a production site in Sicily.

On June 26, 2020, ENERGYNEST and Siemens Energy announced a long-term partnership for joint development of thermal energy storage systems, in which the company eyes to incorporate their proprietary thermal battery with Siemens technologies and projects.

In April 2021, Infracapital invested $110 million and acquired a majority stake in the company.

The first commercial project went into operation in 2022 at the fertiliser manufacturer YARA International.

In February 2023, the company has finished installing a thermal battery to replace natural gas usage for the Belgium manufacturing plant of Avery Dennison.
