= Yara Belle Plaine =

Canadian fertilizer manufacturer

Yara Belle Plaine Inc
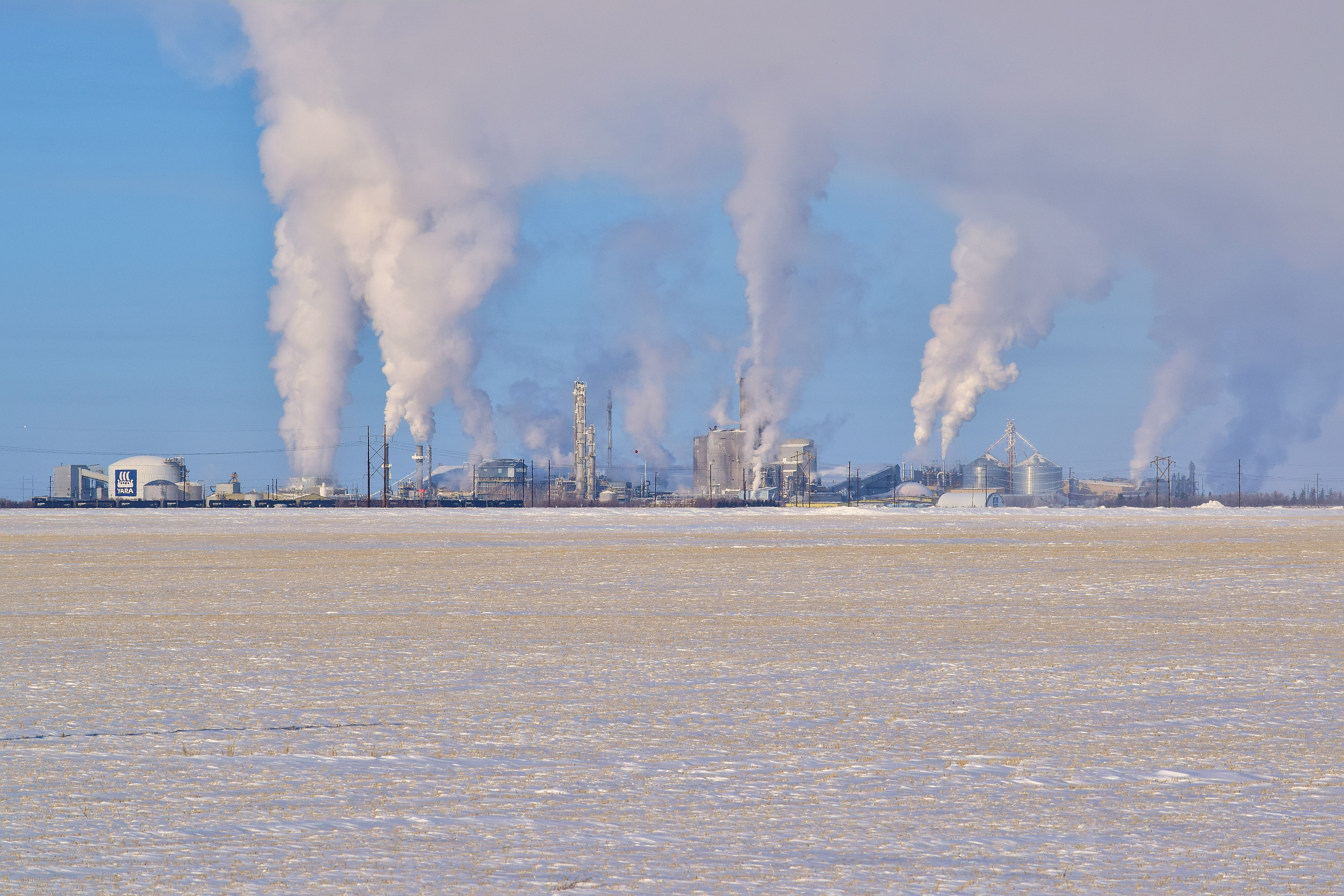
- Fertilizer plant in Belle Plaine.
- Company type: Private
- Industry: Fertilizer
- Headquarters: Regina, Saskatchewan, Canada
- Products: Fertilizer
- Website: www.yaracanada.ca

Yara Belle Plaine Inc is a nitrate-based fertilizer manufacturer based in Regina, Saskatchewan, Canada, and is part of the Yara International group of companies.

Originally the company was established in 1984 as SaskFerco Products Inc., a joint venture between Cargill (50%), the Government of Saskatchewan (49%), and Citibank Canada (1%), to construct a plant near Belle Plaine, Saskatchewan at a cost of $435 million for the production of granular urea and anhydrous ammonia. SaskFerco became one of the largest North America manufacturers of granular urea (2,850 tonnes per day capacity) and anhydrous ammonia (1,860 tonnes per day) and urea ammonium nitrate (670 tonnes per day). The plant also became the largest consumer of natural gas in the province.

In 2008 the company was sold by the province and its partner at the time, The Mosaic Company, to Yara International for $1.6 billion. The name of the company was changed to Yara Belle Plaine Inc., and it continued to be headquartered in Regina.
