= Thorleif Enger =

Norwegian businessman (born 1943)

- Born: 31 October 1943 (age 82)
- Education: University of Colorado (PhD)
- Occupation: Businessman
- Employer(s): Yara International, Norsk Hydro

Thorleif Enger (born 31 October 1943) is a Norwegian businessman and was chief executive officer of Yara International. Enger was educated at the University of Colorado where he earned his PhD in Structural Engineering. He worked for Royal Dutch Shell until 1973, after which he moved to Norway to work for Norsk Hydro. He was director of the Oseberg oil field 1982–86, and from then until 1996 was president of the exploration and production division. He was then executive vice president of Hydro Oil and Gas until 1999, when he became executive vice president of Hydro Agri, and when this division was demerged to create Yara in 2004 he became its CEO. He announced his retirement in September 2008. Enger has been president of the International Fertilizer Industry Association, and has been a chairman or non-executive director of several boards, including Telenor, Spring Energy, HitecVision, and Marine Harvest. In 2010, Kapital named him one of the top ten business leaders in Norway after World War II.

== Early life and education ==
Enger was born 31 October 1943. He is the brother of Ole Enger, former CEO of REC, and now chairman of REC Solar. They grew up on a farm in Øvre Eiker. Enger earned his PhD in Structural Engineering from the University of Colorado.

== Career ==
=== Shell ===
Enger was employed at Royal Dutch Shell's Houston office from 1970 to 1973 where he worked on an LNG-project.

=== Norsk Hydro Oil and Gas ===
==== Oseberg ====
Enger was selected to be asset manager for the giant Oseberg field in the North Sea which at the time was the largest offshore project in the world. Oseberg was the first operatorship of Norsk Hydro. The project was completed within time and on budget. At its peak the production was 500,000 barrels per day. This project was innovative in the sense that it used gas injection from Troll. Troll Oseberg Gas Injection (TOGI) was controversial, but it turned out to be a commercial and technical success.

==== Head of Hydro Exploration and Production ====
Enger became head of Hydro Exploration and Production due to his handling of the Oseberg project. He was head of E&P from 1987 to 1996. During this period the Hydro Oil and Gas business increased substantially by adding a number of fields to its North Sea portfolio. Fields where Norsk Hydro was the operator included Oseberg, Brage, Njord, and Troll oil. During this period Norsk Hydro production operatorship went from zero to roughly 1 million barrels per day. The portfolio also included E&P activities in Russia, UK, Maghreb and Angola.

==== Head of Hydro Oil and Gas ====
Enger was head of Hydro Oil and Gas from 1996 to 1999. NORSOK was an initiative made by the Norwegian government to tackle cost overruns on the Norwegian Continental Shelf. It was led by Enger, and is considered to be successful although its ambitious targets were not fully met.

=== Norsk Hydro Agri ===
Hydro Agri, the agricultural division of Norsk Hydro had for quite some time delivered unsatisfactory results and a turnaround operation was initiated in 1999 when Enger became head of the organization. During a 3-year period the business went through a big transition selling off non-core business, closing unprofitable plants and markets and reducing fixed costs and manning by more than 30%.

=== Yara ===
Yara was spun out of Norsk Hydro and became a listed company in the spring of 2004. Since then, the market capitalization of the company increased several fold reaching about 100 billion NOK and being one of the largest companies on the Oslo Stock Exchange. Yara is one of the largest suppliers of fertilizer in the world with a presence on all continents. Enger resigned as CEO in 2008.

==== Yara Prize ====
In 2005 the Yara Prize was initiated and awarded to people having made outstanding contributions to the development of Agriculture in Africa. This was highly appreciated and successful, and the Oslo award ceremonies and conferences in Oslo were attended by leading people in the field including the Nobel Prize winner Norman Borlaug, Jeffrey Sachs, Kofi Annan, as well as leading African politicians.

=== After Yara ===
Enger was member of the Business Advisory Group to the Africa Progress Panel.

=== Board memberships, awards, published books ===
Enger has been chairman of Telenor, Spring Energy, Agrinos, Green Energy Group, and Treka, and he has been a board member of HitecVision, FMC Technologies, Marine Harvest, Acergy, PGS, Kverneland, NGI, and the supervisory board of E.ON Ruhrgas. He was elected Norway's SPE Oilman of the Year in 1996, and selected by the business magazine Kapital in 2010 as one of the 10 best business leaders in Norway after World War II. Enger's book "Det handler om å bli best" was published in 2012.

== Lawsuit ==
In 2014, Enger was alongside two former colleagues in Yara charged with two counts of corruption. The case is unique in the sense that Enger has declared himself innocent whilst the company, Yara, has declared itself guilty. Enger was declared innocent in 2016, and received compensation for being wrongly accused.

== Personal life ==
Enger is married to an American and has two children.
