= Khalifa University =

Public research university in Abu Dhabi, UAE

Coordinates: 24.44736°N 54.39494°E

- Motto: Nurturing tomorrow's leaders. Growing the knowledge economy
- Type: Public
- Established: 2007
- President: Ebrahim Al Hajri
- Students: 4,000+
- Location: Abu Dhabi, United Arab Emirates
- Campus: Urban
- Website: Khalifa University

Khalifa University (Arabic: جامعة خليفة) is a public research university located in Abu Dhabi, United Arab Emirates. It was established in its current form in February 2017 by decree of UAE President Khalifa bin Zayed Al Nahyan, through the merger of three institutions: Khalifa University of Science, Technology and Research (KUSTAR), the Petroleum Institute, and the Masdar Institute of Science and Technology. The university comprises three colleges, three research institutes, and 20 research centers covering science, engineering, and medicine.

Khalifa University is the top ranked university in the United Arab Emirates and among the leading research institutions in the Arab world. In the QS World University Rankings 2026, it is placed 177th globally and 3rd in the Arab region — ranking 11th globally for international faculty and 37th globally for academic reputation. In the Times Higher Education World University Rankings 2026, it is placed 201st globally and 5th in the Arab region. Its research output is among the most cited in the region — between 2022 and 2024 the university produced 7,018 publications with a Field-Weighted Citation Impact (FWCI) of 2.21, meaning its research receives on average more than double the citations of comparable work worldwide. In 2024, 112 faculty members were included in the Stanford University–Elsevier Top 2% worldwide scientists list.

== History ==
Khalifa University traces its origins to 1989, when Etisalat University College was founded in Sharjah by the Emirates Telecommunications Corporation to provide programmes in engineering and applied sciences. In 2001, the Petroleum Institute was established in Abu Dhabi by Emiri decree, funded by the Abu Dhabi National Oil Company (ADNOC) and international partners including BP, Shell, Total, and the Japan Oil Development Company, as a specialised centre for petroleum engineering education and research developed in partnership with the Colorado School of Mines. The Petroleum Institute graduated its first cohort of engineers in 2006 and admitted its first female students the same year. In 2007, Khalifa University of Science, Technology and Research (KUSTAR) was established by presidential decree, acquiring Etisalat University College in the same year. Also in 2007, the Masdar Institute of Science and Technology was established in collaboration with the Massachusetts Institute of Technology (MIT) as the region's first graduate-level research university focused on advanced energy and sustainable technologies.

In February 2017, UAE President Khalifa bin Zayed Al Nahyan issued a decree merging KUSTAR, the Petroleum Institute, and the Masdar Institute into a single institution named Khalifa University of Science and Technology. At the time of the merger the three institutions together enrolled more than 4,600 students and employed over 465 academic staff. The merger brought together KUSTAR's broad engineering focus, the Petroleum Institute's industry-oriented programmes, and the Masdar Institute's emphasis on sustainability and renewable energy under a unified research-intensive structure aligned with the UAE's Vision 2021 goals for a knowledge-based economy.

== Academics ==
Khalifa University comprises three colleges — the College of Engineering and Physical Sciences, the College of Computing and Mathematical Sciences, and the College of Medicine and Health Sciences — alongside three research institutes, 18 research centers, and 36 academic departments. The university offers undergraduate, postgraduate, and doctoral programmes across engineering, science, computing, and medicine.

The university's Institute for International and Civil Security (IICS) offers a graduate programme focused on security policy and research, the first of its kind in the Gulf region.

== Research and Partnerships ==
Khalifa University maintains academic and research partnerships with a range of international institutions. These include associations with the Georgia Institute of Technology, the Texas A&M University Nuclear Security Science and Policy Institute, and KAIST. In 2011, the university signed a memorandum of understanding with the University of Bristol to establish the Visual Signal Analysis and Processing (VSAP) research centre in Abu Dhabi. In 2019, it established the Emirates Nuclear Technology Centre in collaboration with the Emirates Nuclear Energy Corporation and the Federal Authority for Nuclear Regulation. Also in 2019, the university partnered with the University of Milan and the Scuola Superiore Sant'Anna of Pisa to establish a joint laboratory for embodied artificial intelligence in Abu Dhabi.

In 2022, Khalifa University and the University of Manchester launched a research partnership focused on graphene innovation. In 2023, the university collaborated with Dassault Aviation of France on the development of graphene-based and two-dimensional material technologies for aerospace applications. In 2024, Khalifa University launched a dual PhD program in Biomedical Sciences and Engineering in partnership with KU Leuven of Belgium.

In 2023, Khalifa University launched the Khalifa University Science and Technology Review, a bilingual Arabic and English publication covering research and innovation. In 2024, the university launched Explorer, a research magazine produced in collaboration with Springer Nature.

== Campuses ==
Khalifa University has two campuses in Abu Dhabi — the Main Campus and the Sas Al Nakhl Campus.

The Main Campus is located on Abu Dhabi Island and houses the university's central administration. It comprises 135,000 square metres of facilities including 105 laboratories, 72 classrooms, a sports centre, and dining outlets. A campus extension completed in 2016 added a building recognised at the 2015 MENA Interior Design and Architecture Awards. In July 2024, Khalifa University awarded a public-private partnership concession to a consortium named KUnnected Living, comprising Plenary Group, Besix, and Mazrui International, to design, build, finance, and maintain 3,260 student rooms across both campuses over a 23-year period.

The Sas Al Nakhl Campus hosts the ADNOC Research and Innovation Center (ADRIC), a research facility comprising 39 laboratories covering reservoir rock characterization and reservoir fluid characterization. The campus also provides student accommodation, dining facilities, two libraries, an Independent Learning Center (ILC), exercise rooms, sports courts, and medical clinics.

Khalifa University also operates the Masdar Institute Solar Platform (MISP) at Masdar City, Abu Dhabi, a research and demonstration facility dedicated to concentrated solar power (CSP) and thermal energy storage technologies. Inaugurated in November 2015, the MISP is built around a 100kW beam-down solar concentrator — the first of its kind in the UAE — and provides local and international research institutes and industry partners with infrastructure to test and validate CSP technologies under desert conditions.

== Scholarships ==
Khalifa University offers scholarships to both UAE National and international students at undergraduate and postgraduate level. External sponsorship programmes are provided by government and industry partners including the Abu Dhabi National Oil Company (ADNOC), the Abu Dhabi Investment Authority (ADIA), the UAE Ministry of Education, the UAE Ministry of Defence, the UAE Ministry of Interior, and Emirates Health Services.

== Rankings ==
Khalifa University is consistently ranked as the top university in the United Arab Emirates. In the QS World University Rankings 2027, released in June 2026, it was placed 147th globally, rising 30 places from the previous edition to become the first university in the UAE to enter the global top 150, and was named the country's leading institution for the ninth consecutive year. The university had placed 177th in the 2026 edition and 202nd in the 2025 edition, reflecting a sustained upward trajectory.

In the 2026 edition, the university recorded its strongest results in internationalisation and research impact, ranking 11th in the world for International Faculty and 37th for Academic Reputation, while leading all UAE institutions for Citations per Faculty and Faculty–Student Ratio. It reported a graduate employment rate of 94 per cent.

In the QS Arab Region University Rankings 2026, Khalifa University was ranked third in the Arab world and first nationally.

By subject, the university performs most strongly in engineering disciplines. In the QS World University Rankings by Subject 2026 it was ranked 6th in the world for Petroleum Engineering, up from 7th the previous year. It entered the global top 100 for Electrical and Electronic Engineering (92nd) and Chemical Engineering (94th), and was also ranked for Mathematics (130th), Mechanical Engineering (133rd), and Computer Science and Information Systems (137th), placing in a total of 15 subjects.

== Accreditation ==
All programmes at Khalifa University are fully licensed and accredited by the Commission for Academic Accreditation (CAA) of the UAE Ministry of Education. In 2015, the university achieved ABET accreditation from the Engineering Accreditation Commission (EAC) for its engineering programmes and from the Applied and Natural Science Accreditation Commission (ANSAC) for its Petroleum Geosciences programme.

== See also ==
List of universities and colleges in the United Arab Emirates
