= Yarwil =

Norwegian marine company

Yarwil AS
- Industry: Marine environment
- Founded: 2007
- Headquarters: Lysaker, Norway
- Key people: Kai Låtun (Director)
- Products: NOx abating systems
- Website: www.yarwil.com Wilhelmsen Environmental Solutions

Yarwil AS is a joint venture between Yara International and Wilhelmsen Maritime Services. The Norwegian registered company provides systems for the reduction of NOx emissions from ship engines.

Its technology is based on the selective catalytic reduction (SCR) method using urea, as a reactant.

The company was established as a reaction to the increased focus by the global community on emissions to air from the maritime industry. New IMO regulations, MEPC 58, are in place, which demand a reduction in NOx emissions from ships globally of 20% by 2011 and 80% by 2016.

Yarwil was registered on 22 August 2007 and has its headquarters at Lysaker just outside Oslo in Norway.

On 21 October 2013, a press release was issued by Yara International stating they had acquired full ownership of Yarwil and that the company would become part of their NOxCare initiative as of 1 January 2014.
