= Petroleum Institute =

University in Abu Dhabi, United Arab Emirates

The Khalifa University Petroleum Institute
- Former names: The Petroleum Institute University and Research Center
- Type: Research Center
- Established: 2017 - as part of Khalifa University; 2001 - as independent university
- Founders: Khalifa bin Zayed Al Nahyan
- Parent institution: Khalifa University
- Chairman: Hamed bin Zayed Al Nahyan
- Provost: Bayan Sharif
- Director: Lourdes Vega (acting)
- Location: Abu Dhabi, United Arab Emirates
- Campus: Urban
- Language: English
- Website: https://www.pi.ac.ae

The Petroleum Institute (PI) (formerly (evidentially) The Petroleum Institute University and Research Center) is a multidisciplinary research center of Khalifa University which focuses on oil, gas and broader energy industries. The Institute previously operated as an independent entity, funded by a consortium of national and international oil companies. The center is currently part of Khalifa University's Sas Al Nakhl Campus.

PI was established in 2001 by an Emiri decree under the direction of His Highness Sheikh Khalifa bin Zayed Al Nahyan, ruler of Abu Dhabi. It was initially financed and governed by a consortium of five major oil companies: ADNOC, Royal Dutch Shell, BP, Total S.A., and Japan Oil Development Company, a wholly owned subsidiary of INPEX. The partnered with the following universities: Colorado School of Mines, Johannes Kepler Universitat Linz, University of Maryland, University of Minnesota, The University of Texas at Austin, Rice University and China University of Petroleum.

In 2017, The Petroleum Institute and The Masdar Institute of Science and Technology became parts of Khalifa University.

The PI admitted its first students in the Fall of 2001.

The Petroleum Institute also offers graduate level programs.
