= Sharjah Sustainable City =

City in the United Arab Emirates

- City
- Sharjah Sustainable City

- Location in the UAE
- Coordinates: 25°21′33.9″N 55°33′05.3″E
- Country: United Arab Emirates
- Emirate: Sharjah
- Established: 2003

Government
  - CEO: Yousif Ahmed Al-Mutawa
- Time zone: UTC+04 (Arabian Standard Time)
- Website: www.sharjahsustainablecity.ae

Sharjah Sustainable City is a planned, environmentally conscious urban development located in the Al Rahmaniya district of Sharjah, United Arab Emirates. Developed jointly by the Sharjah Investment and Development Authority (Shurooq) and Diamond Developers, the city spans 7.2 million square feet and serves as a model for sustainable urban development in the region. It is inspired by The Sustainable City project in Dubai.

== Overview ==
The development comprises 1,250 residential units distributed across four construction phases, with property sizes ranging between 2,035 and 3,818 square feet. It is valued at around AED 2 billion and incorporates several sustainability-focused features:

- Rooftop solar panels to reduce electricity consumption
- 100% wastewater recycling for landscape irrigation
- Infrastructure for electric vehicles and autonomous shuttles
- Greenhouses and urban farming producing over 10,000 kg of organic vegetables annually
- Waste management programs aiming to divert 85% of waste from landfills

These initiatives aim to reduce utility bills by up to 50% and promote a low-carbon lifestyle.

== Design and Infrastructure ==
Sharjah Sustainable City is designed to minimize its environmental footprint through integrated planning:

- Energy: Rooftop solar energy generation supports the city's net-zero goals, complemented by smart grids and battery storage systems.
- Water: Greywater is treated and reused for landscape irrigation, conserving potable water resources.
- Waste: A circular economy approach encourages recycling, composting, and minimal landfill use.
- Mobility: Features include electric vehicle charging stations, cycling infrastructure, pedestrian-friendly zones, and electric shuttle services.
- Construction: Sustainable materials such as recycled steel and low-carbon concrete are used to enhance energy efficiency.
- Green space: Over 30% of the total area is designated as green space, including parks, community gardens, and jogging paths.

== Community and Lifestyle ==
The city promotes a high standard of living through integrated services:

- Education: A sustainability-focused school and public workshops on environmental education.
- Healthcare and Retail: Clinics, wellness centers, and organic markets.
- Recreation: Sports facilities, cycling trails, a multipurpose community center, and regular eco-events.

== History ==
The concept for Sharjah Sustainable City originated in 2003, with full project development initiated in 2019 under the framework of Sharjah’s Vision 2021. Groundbreaking occurred in 2020, followed by phased handovers beginning in 2022 and the final delivery of 324 villas in 2023. By 2024, property sales exceeded AED 2.5 billion, reflecting growing public interest in environmentally friendly housing aligned with the UAE’s Net Zero 2050 initiative.

== Governance ==
The city is managed by a dedicated operations team led by CEO Yousif Ahmed Al-Mutawa, who oversees sustainability initiatives, planning, and urban management.

== Awards ==
Sharjah Sustainable City has earned regional and global recognition for its innovative approach to real estate and sustainability:

- Best International Sustainable Residential Development – International Property Awards 2022–23
- Best Sustainable Residential Development – Arabia – 2022
- Real Estate Development Company of the Year – Real Estate Excellence Awards 2021 and 2022
- Sustainable Community Award – Smart Built Environment Awards 2022
- Customer Happiness and Experience Initiative – Gulf Real Estate Awards 2022
- Four Gold Awards – Gulf Real Estate Awards 2022
- Bronze Award for Best Community Development – Gulf Sustainability Awards 2022

== Future Plans ==
The city plans to expand its solar infrastructure to approach full energy neutrality, introduce vertical farming systems, and collaborate with regional universities on smart city technologies and climate adaptation research.

== See also ==
- Green building
- List of planned communities
