= Belle Plaine, Saskatchewan =

Community in Saskatchewan, Canada

Belle Plaine
- Village
- Village of Belle Plaine
- Aerial view (2026)

- Location of Belle Plaine in Saskatchewan
- Coordinates: 50°24′N 105°09′W
- Country: Canada
- Province: Saskatchewan
- Region: South-central
- Rural municipality: Pense No. 160
- Post office Founded: 1903-05-01
- Incorporated (Village): 1925

Government
  - Type: Municipal
  - Governing body: Belle Plaine Village Council
  - Mayor: Jeff Geiger
  - MP (Palliser): Ray Boughen
  - MLA (Thunder Creek): Lyle Stewart

Population (2016)
  - Total: 85
  - Summer (DST): CST
- Postal code: S0G 0G0
- Area code: 306
- Highways: Highway 1 (TCH) / Highway 642

Belle Plaine (2016 population: 85) is a village in the Canadian province of Saskatchewan within the Rural Municipality of Pense No. 160 and Census Division No. 6. Belle Plaine is located on Highway 1 (also known as the Trans-Canada Highway), 21 kilometres east of the city of Moose Jaw in south-central Saskatchewan.

== History ==
Belle Plaine incorporated as a village on August 12, 1910.

== Demographics ==
Population history (1981–2016)
Year	Pop.	±%
1981	69	—
1986	82	+18.8%
1991	80	−2.4%
1996	64	−20.0%
2001	70	+9.4%
2006	64	−8.6%
2011	66	+3.1%
2016	85	+28.8%
Source: Statistics Canada via Saskatchewan Bureau of Statistics

In the 2021 Census of Population conducted by Statistics Canada, Belle Plaine had a population of 79 living in 32 of its 37 total private dwellings, a change of −7.1% from its 2016 population of 85. With a land area of 1.35 km^{2} (0.52 sq mi), it had a population density of 58.5/km^{2} (151.6/sq mi) in 2021.

In the 2016 Census of Population, the Village of Belle Plaine recorded a population of 85 living in 33 of its 43 total private dwellings, a 22.4% change from its 2011 population of 66. With a land area of 1.34 km^{2} (0.52 sq mi), it had a population density of 63.4/km^{2} (164.3/sq mi) in 2016.

== Business ==
- Mosaic Potash Mine at Belle Plaine
- Terra Grain Fuels Ethanol Facility
- Yara Belle Plaine - fertilizer production plant

== Infrastructure ==
Transportation

- Highway 642
- Highway 1

== See also ==
- List of communities in Saskatchewan
- List of villages in Saskatchewan
