= Masdar City =

Green city in Abu Dhabi, United Arab Emirates

Masdar City مدينة مصدر Masdar City Free Zone
- UAE Free Zone

- Location of Masdar City in the UAE
- Coordinates: 24°25′45″N 54°37′6″E
- Country: United Arab Emirates
- Emirate: Abu Dhabi
- Initiated: 2006

Area
  - Total: 6 km^{2} (2.3 sq mi)
  - Land: 6 km^{2} (2.3 sq mi)
  - Water: 0 km^{2} (0 sq mi)

Population (2024)
  - Total: 15,000
  - Density: 2,500/km^{2} (6,500/sq mi)
- Time zone: UTC+04 (Gulf Standard Time)
- Postal codes: P.O. Box 2282, Abu Dhabi, UAE
- Website: masdarcity.ae

Masdar City (Arabic: مدينة مصدر, romanized: Madīnat Maṣdar, lit. 'source city') is an urban community in Abu Dhabi, the capital of the United Arab Emirates. It was built by Masdar, a subsidiary of the state-owned Mubadala Investment Company, with the majority of seed capital provided by the government of Abu Dhabi.

Launched in 2006 as a $22 billion state-funded project to construct "the world's most sustainable eco-city" by 2016, the start date for the project has since been delayed indefinitely. By 2023, only 15,000 people lived and worked in Masdar City (of whom 5,000 were residents), and the community covered less than a sixth of the area it was intended to cover.

== Commercial tenants and population ==
Siemens Energy regional HQ in Masdar City—the first LEED Platinum Building in Abu Dhabi

UAE Space Agency in Masdar City

Masdar City is the headquarters of the International Renewable Energy Agency (IRENA). It was selected after a campaign by the UAE, and construction was completed in 2015.

The regional headquarters for Siemens is also in Masdar City. The LEED Platinum building makes use of sustainable and energy-efficient materials and building techniques. It was designed to use 45% less energy and 50% less water than typical office buildings. It won an award for best office building at the MIPIM Architectural Review Future Projects Awards in 2012. The Middle East Architect Awards named it both the best and most sustainable office building the same year. Siemens signed an initial ten-year lease with Masdar City.

Other institutions in Masdar City include Mohamed bin Zayed University of Artificial Intelligence, G42, the UAE Space Agency, and Khalifa University.

== Urban plan ==
The UAE government initiated the Masdar City project in 2006, with the state-owned enterprise Mubadala Development Company beginning work with a US$22 billion budget. The original plan was that it would take approximately eight years to build, with the first phase scheduled to be completed and habitable in 2009.

Construction began in February 2008, and the first six buildings of the city were completed and occupied in October 2010. But due to the Great Recession and the 2008 financial crisis, planned completion was delayed to between 2020 and 2025. By 2016, less than 300,000 square metres (0.12 sq mi) had been developed, and final completion was estimated for 2030. As of 2020, a 2030 completion date was still projected.

The city is meant to be an example of sustainable urban development, innovation, and community living. As designed, it would be home to 45,000–50,000 people and 1,500 businesses. More than 60,000 workers were projected to commute to the city daily, but by 2023, only 15,000 people lived and worked in Masdar City (of whom 5,000 were residents).

Foster and Partners designed six buildings in the project's first phase. Districts are designed to be elevated by seven meters to create thermal insulation and separate pedestrians from vehicle traffic. The Eco-residences in Masdar City will have terracotta walls decorated with arabesque patterns, and they will be rated LEED Platinum. Masdar City will contain a tech park made from recycled standard 40-foot shipping containers. Passive design features will include wind towers to improve ventilation and short, narrow streets to create pedestrian-accommodating spaces.

== Transportation ==
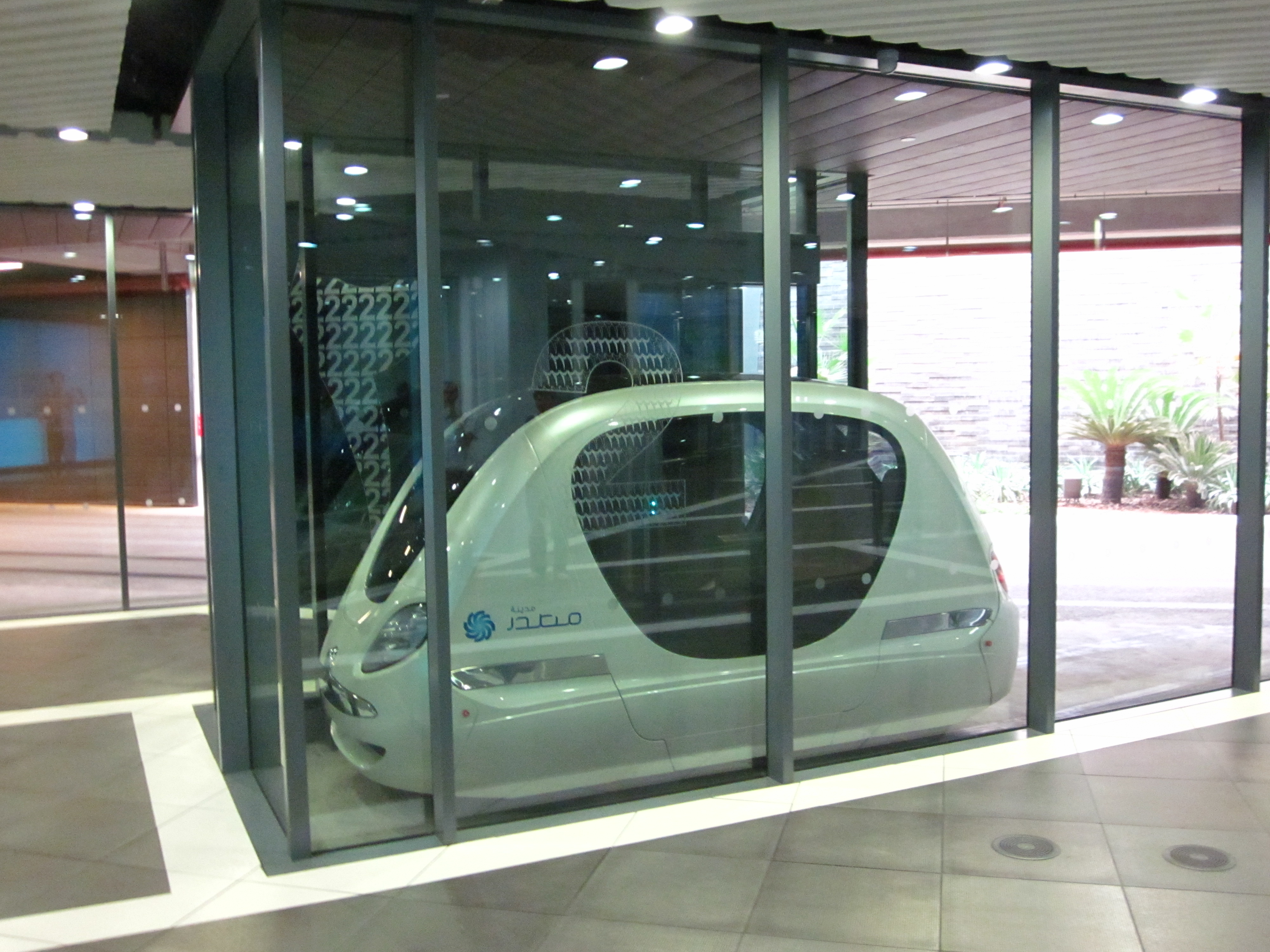
Podcar at a personal rapid transit station

Transportation options in Masdar City will include public mass transit and a personal rapid transit (PRT) system that will transport people in autonomous electric pods along an underground track. As of 2025, the PRT system remains a prototype, with high costs making expansion impractical.

In October 2010, it was announced the PRT would not expand beyond the pilot due to the cost of creating the undercroft to segregate the system from pedestrian traffic. In 2011, a test fleet of 10 Mitsubishi i-MiEV electric cars was deployed as part of a one-year pilot to test point-to-point transportation for the city as a complement of the PRT.

In 2018, as part of a trial project, seven autonomous shuttles, called NAVYA, began to operate on the podium, carrying passengers between the car park and the city center. A further route was due to open in 2019, running from the residential complex above the city's North Car Park to the headquarters of the International Renewable Energy Agency and the Majid Al Futtaim's My City Centre Masdar Shopping Mall.

Masdar City is working on using a mix of electric and other clean-energy vehicles for mass transit inside the city. Internal combustion engine vehicles are prohibited, and visitors arriving by car must park at the edge of Masdar City. Abu Dhabi's planned but delayed light rail and metro line may eventually connect Masdar City's center with the greater metropolitan area.

== Renewable resources ==
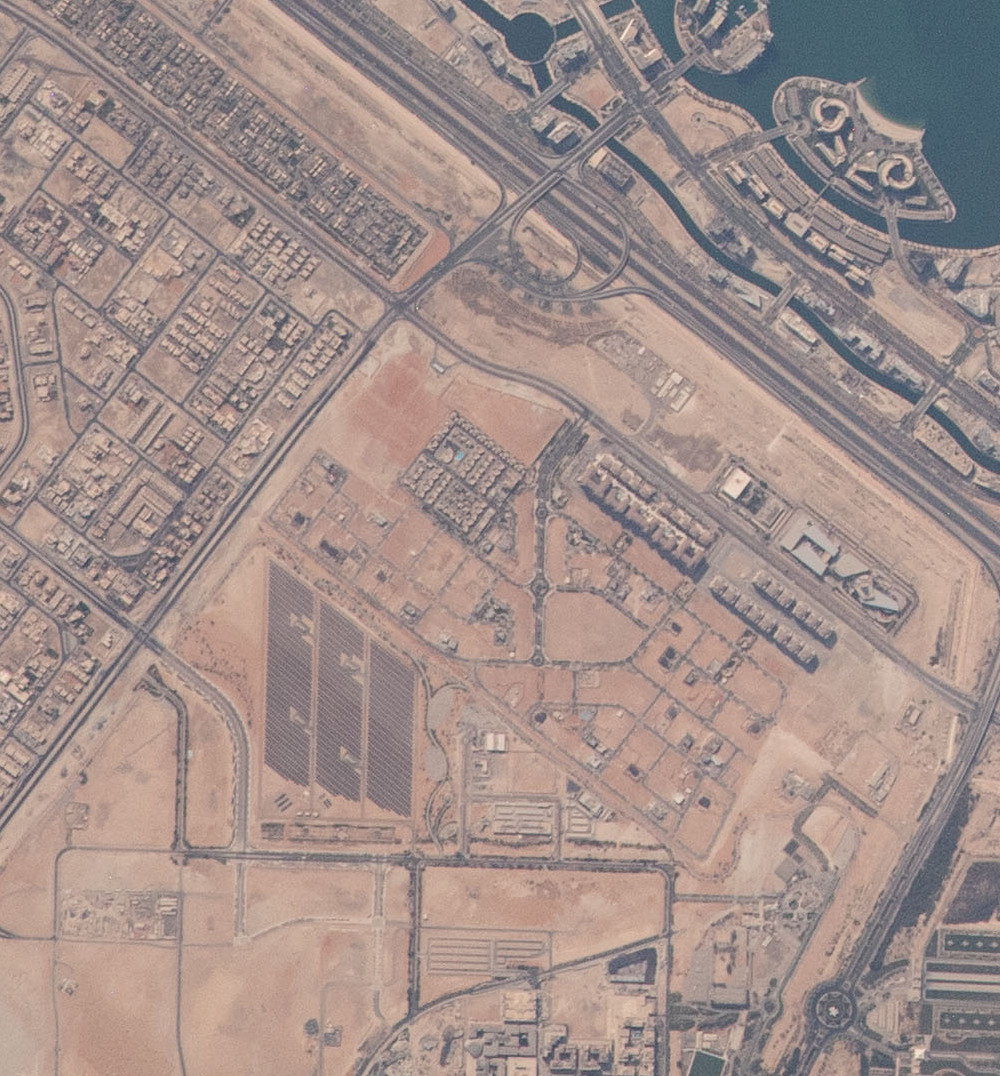
Masdar City 10 MW solar photovoltaic farm (2021 photo)

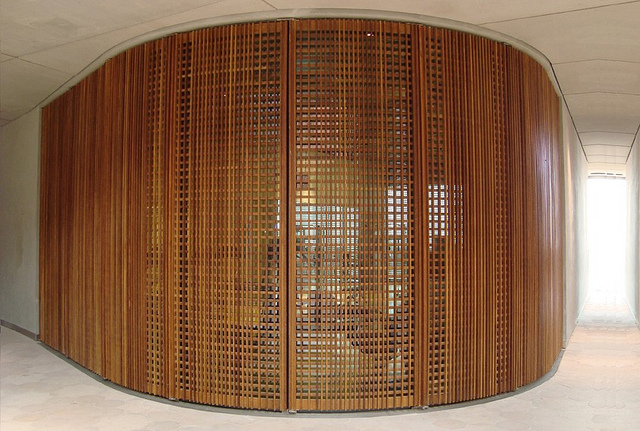
Palmwood screens used in Masdar City

The original master plan for Masdar City envisioned it functioning on its own grid with full carbon neutrality. On-site renewable energy as of 2025 includes a 10 MW solar plant and 1 MW of rooftop solar. Through passive design features, buildings in the city use 40% less energy than the average for Abu Dhabi.

In 2016, Masdar City was connected to the utility grid. Gerard Evenden, the lead architect, said the original plan called for powering the entire city through on-site methods such as rooftop solar panels.

Low-flow water fixtures are used throughout the city to reduce water use, and wastewater is recycled "as many times as possible", with greywater being utilized for crop irrigation and other purposes.

The exterior wood used throughout the city is palmwood, a sustainable hardwood substitute developed by Pacific Green using plantation coconut palms that no longer bear fruit. Palmwood features include the entrance gates, screens, and doors.

== Reaction ==
The project is supported by the global conservation charity World Wide Fund for Nature and the sustainability group Bioregional. In 2008, in response to the project's commitment to zero carbon, zero waste, and other environmentally friendly goals, WWF and Bioregional endorsed Masdar City as an official One Planet Living Community.

The US Department of Energy has signed a partnership agreement with Masdar in a deal that will see the two organizations share expertise to support plans on zero-carbon cities.

The Alliance to Save Energy honored Masdar City with a 2012 EE Visionary Award in recognition of the city's contributions to the advancement of energy efficiency.

Some skeptics have expressed concern that the city will be only symbolic for Abu Dhabi. In an interview in 2011, Geoffrey M. Heal, a professor at Columbia Business School and an expert in environmental economics, called Masdar City "a gimmick, a way of attracting publicity and attention". Its use of solar energy is not a practical model for others to follow, Heal said, given that few places in the world have as much year-round sunlight as the Persian Gulf.

== See also ==
- Sustainable city
- Sharjah Sustainable City
